

Deaths in December

 29: Avi Cohen
 21: Enzo Bearzot
 15: Bob Feller
 15: Stan Heal
 12: Tom Walkinshaw
 8: John James
 5: Don Meredith
 2: Ron Santo

Current sporting seasons

American football 2010
National Football League
NCAA Division I FBS
NCAA Division I FCS

Auto racing 2010
V8 Supercar
FIA GT1 World Championship

Basketball 2010
NBA
NCAA Division I men
NCAA Division I women
Euroleague
EuroLeague Women
Eurocup
EuroChallenge
France
Germany
Greece
Israel
Italy
Philippines
Philippine Cup
Russia
Spain
Turkey

Football (soccer) 2010
National teams competitions
UEFA Euro 2012 qualifying
2012 Africa Cup of Nations qualification
International clubs competitions
UEFA (Europe) Champions League
UEFA Europa League
UEFA Women's Champions League
Copa Sudamericana
CAF Confederation Cup
CONCACAF (North & Central America) Champions League
OFC (Oceania) Champions League
Domestic (national) competitions
Argentina
Australia
Brazil
England
France
Germany
Iran
Italy
Japan
Scotland
Spain

Golf 2010
European Tour
LPGA Tour

Ice hockey 2010
National Hockey League
Kontinental Hockey League
Czech Extraliga
Elitserien
Canadian Hockey League:
OHL, QMJHL, WHL
NCAA Division I men
NCAA Division I women

Rugby union 2010
Heineken Cup
European Challenge Cup
English Premiership
Celtic League
LV Cup
Top 14
Sevens World Series

Snooker
Players Tour Championship

Winter sports
Alpine Skiing World Cup
Biathlon World Cup
Bobsleigh World Cup
Cross-Country Skiing World Cup
Grand Prix of Figure Skating
Freestyle Skiing World Cup
Luge World Cup
Nordic Combined World Cup
Short Track Speed Skating World Cup
Skeleton World Cup
Ski Jumping World Cup
Snowboard World Cup
Speed Skating World Cup

Days of the month

December 31, 2010 (Friday)

American football
NFL news:
The Carolina Panthers announce that they will not renew the contract of head coach John Fox for the 2011 season.
NCAA bowl games:
Meineke Car Care Bowl in Charlotte, North Carolina: South Florida 31, Clemson 26
Sun Bowl in El Paso, Texas: Notre Dame 33, Miami 17
Liberty Bowl in Memphis, Tennessee: UCF 10, Georgia 6
Chick-fil-A Bowl in Atlanta: Florida State 26, South Carolina 17

Cross-country skiing
Tour de Ski:
Stage 1 in Oberhof, Germany:
Men's 3.75 km Freestyle Prologue:  Marcus Hellner  7:34.5  Alexei Petukhov  7:36.5  Petter Northug  7:37.4
World Cup Distance standings (after 6 of 17 races): (1) Alexander Legkov  333 points (2) Dario Cologna  276 (3) Lukáš Bauer  253
World Cup Overall standings (after 10 of 31 races): (1) Legkov 533 points (2) Cologna 503 (3) Hellner 353
Women's 2.5 km Freestyle Prologue:  Justyna Kowalczyk  6:39.0  Charlotte Kalla  6:40.5  Astrid Uhrenholdt Jacobsen  6:43.8
World Cup Distance standings (after 6 of 17 races): (1) Marit Bjørgen  410 points (2) Kowalczyk 365 (3) Kalla 215
World Cup Overall standings (after 10 of 31 races): (1) Bjørgen 760 points (2) Kowalczyk 589 (3) Arianna Follis  428

Ice hockey
World Junior Championships in Buffalo and Lewiston, United States: (teams in bold advance to the semifinals, teams in italics advance to the quarterfinals)
Group A:
 0–6 
 2–1 
Final standings: United States 11 points, Finland 10, Switzerland 6, Slovakia 2,  1.
Group B:
 5–6 (SO) 
 3–8 
Final standings: Sweden 11 points, Canada 10, Russia 6, Czech Republic 3,  0.
Spengler Cup in Davos, Switzerland:
Final: SKA Saint Petersburg  4–3  Team Canada
SKA Saint Petersburg win the Cup for the fourth time and the first since 1977.

December 30, 2010 (Thursday)

American football
NCAA bowl games:
Armed Forces Bowl in University Park, Texas: Army 16, SMU 14
Pinstripe Bowl in The Bronx: Syracuse 36, Kansas State 34
Music City Bowl in Nashville, Tennessee: North Carolina 30, Tennessee 27 (2OT)
Holiday Bowl in San Diego: Washington 19, Nebraska 7

Basketball
NCAA women's basketball: Stanford 71, Connecticut 59
The Huskies' Division I-record winning streak ends at 90 by the Cardinal, who were also the last team to beat the Huskies.

Cricket
Pakistan in New Zealand:
3rd T20I in Christchurch:  183/6 (20 overs);  80 (15.5 overs). Pakistan win by 103 runs; New Zealand win 3-match series 2–1.

Equestrianism
Show jumping:
FEI World Cup Western European League:
8th competition in Mechelen (CSI 5*-W):  Jessica Kürten  on Myrtille Paulois  Gregory Wathelet  on Cortes C  Jos Lansink  on Casper van Spieveld
Standings (after 8 of 13 competitions): (1) Kevin Staut  87 points (2) Rolf-Göran Bengtsson  57 (3) Meredith Michaels-Beerbaum  50

Ice hockey
World Junior Championships in Buffalo and Lewiston, United States:
Group A:
 6–4 
 0–4 
Standings: United States 8 points (3 games),  7 (3), Switzerland 6 (3), Slovakia 2 (3), Germany 1 (4).
Group B:
 6–3 
 8–2 
Standings: , Sweden 9 points (3 games), Russia, Czech Republic 3 (3), Norway 0 (4).
Spengler Cup in Davos, Switzerland:
Semifinals:
SKA Saint Petersburg  4–3 (OT)  Genève-Servette HC
HC Davos  0–4  Team Canada

December 29, 2010 (Wednesday)

Alpine skiing
Women's World Cup in Semmering, Austria:
Slalom:  Marlies Schild  1:42.06  Maria Riesch  1:42.38  Christina Geiger  1:42.58
Slalom standings (after 4 of 10 races): (1) Schild 300 points (2) Tanja Poutiainen  250 (3) Riesch 240
Overall standings (after 13 of 38 races): (1) Riesch 738 points (2) Lindsey Vonn  617 (3) Poutiainen 430
Men's World Cup in Bormio, Italy:
Downhill:  Michael Walchhofer  1:59.66  Silvan Zurbriggen  1:59.74  Christof Innerhofer  2:00.02
Downhill standings (after 3 of 9 races): (1) Walchhofer 245 points (2) Zurbriggen 230 (3) Aksel Lund Svindal  109
Overall standings (after 11 of 38 races): (1) Zurbriggen 395 points (2) Walchhofer 394 (3) Ted Ligety  321

American football
NCAA bowl games:
Military Bowl in Washington, D.C.: Maryland 51, East Carolina 20
Texas Bowl in Houston: Illinois 38, Baylor 14
Alamo Bowl in San Antonio: Oklahoma State 36, Arizona 10

Cricket
England in Australia:
Ashes series:
Fourth Test in Melbourne, day 4:  98 & 258 (85.4 overs);  513. England win by an innings and 157 runs; lead 5-match series 2–1.
England retain The Ashes for the first time since 1986–87.
India in South Africa:
2nd Test in Durban, day 4:  205 & 228;  131 & 215 (72.3 overs). India win by 87 runs; 3-match series level 1–1.

Football (soccer)
AFF Suzuki Cup Final, second leg (first leg score in parentheses):
 2–1 (0–3) . Malaysia win 4–2 on aggregate.
Malaysia win the Cup for the first time.

Ice hockey
World Junior Championships in Buffalo and Lewiston, United States:
Group A:  5–1 
Standings: Finland 7 points (3 games),  5 (2),  3 (2),  2 (2), Germany 1 (3).
Group B:  1–10 
Standings: Canada 9 points (3 games),  6 (2),  3 (2),  0 (2), Norway 0 (3).
Spengler Cup in Davos, Switzerland:
Quarterfinals:
Genève-Servette HC  2–0  HC Spartak Moscow
Team Canada  4–3 (OT)  HC Sparta Praha

Ski jumping
Four Hills Tournament:
Stage 1 in Oberstdorf, Germany:
HS 137:  Thomas Morgenstern  289.6 points  Matti Hautamäki  273.1  Manuel Fettner  264.0
World Cup standings (after 8 of 26 events): (1) Morgenstern 705 points (2) Andreas Kofler  525 (3) Hautamäki 431

December 28, 2010 (Tuesday)

Alpine skiing
Women's World Cup in Semmering, Austria:
Giant Slalom:  Tessa Worley  2:09.66  Maria Riesch  2:10.28  Kathrin Hölzl  2:10.44
Giant slalom standings (after 4 of 8 races): (1) Worley 332 points (2) Viktoria Rebensburg  235 (3) Hölzl 200
Overall standings (after 12 of 38 races): (1) Riesch 658 points (2) Lindsey Vonn  617 (3) Elisabeth Görgl  416

American football
NFL Week 16 (division champion in bold): Minnesota Vikings 24, Philadelphia Eagles 14
The result earns the Eagles a home game for the Wild Card round of the playoffs and the Chicago Bears a first-round bye.
NCAA bowl games:
Champs Sports Bowl in Orlando, Florida: North Carolina State 23, West Virginia 7
Insight Bowl in Tempe, Arizona: Iowa 27, Missouri 24

Cricket
England in Australia:
Ashes series:
Fourth Test in Melbourne, day 3:  98 & 169/6 (66 overs);  513 (159.1 overs; Jonathan Trott 168*, Peter Siddle 6/75). Australia trail by 246 runs with 4 wickets remaining.
India in South Africa:
2nd Test in Durban, day 3:  205 & 228 (70.5 overs);  131 & 111/3 (27 overs). South Africa require another 192 runs with 7 wickets remaining.
Pakistan in New Zealand:
2nd T20I in Hamilton:  185/7 (20 overs);  146/9 (20 overs). New Zealand win by 39 runs; lead 3-match series 2–0.

Equestrianism
Dressage:
FEI World Cup Western European League:
6th competition in Mechelen (CDI-W):  Edward Gal  on Sisther de Jeu  Hans Peter Minderhoud  on Nadine  Ulla Salzgeber  on Wakana
Standings (after 6 of 10 competitions): (1) Salzgeber 74 points (2) Isabell Werth  57 (3) Richard Davison  55

Ice hockey
World Junior Championships in Buffalo and Lewiston, United States:
Group A:
 0–4 
 6–1 
Standings (after 2 games): United States 5 points, Finland 4, Switzerland 3, Slovakia 2,  1.
Group B:
 7–2 
 2–0 
Standings (after 2 games): Canada, Sweden 6 points, Czech Republic 3, Russia,  0.
Spengler Cup in Davos, Switzerland: (teams in bold advance to the semifinals)
Group Torriani: SKA Saint Petersburg  4–1  HC Sparta Praha
Final standings: SKA Saint Petersburg 6 points,  Genève-Servette HC 3, HC Sparta Praha 0.
Group Cattini: HC Davos  3–2  Team Canada
Final standings: HC Davos 6 points, Team Canada 3,  HC Spartak Moscow 0.

December 27, 2010 (Monday)

American football
NFL Monday Night Football, Week 16 (teams assured of playoff berths in italics): New Orleans Saints 17, Atlanta Falcons 14
NCAA bowl games:
Independence Bowl in Shreveport, Louisiana: Air Force 14, Georgia Tech 7

Cricket
England in Australia:
Ashes series:
Fourth Test in Melbourne, day 2:  98;  444/5 (136 overs; Jonathan Trott 141*). England lead by 346 runs with 5 wickets remaining in the 1st innings.
India in South Africa:
2nd Test in Durban, day 2:  205 (65.1 overs; Dale Steyn 6/50) & 92/4 (30.5 overs);  131 (37.2 overs). India lead by 166 runs with 6 wickets remaining.

Ice hockey
World Junior Championships in Buffalo and Lewiston, United States:
Group A:  2–1 (OT) 
Standings:  3 points (1 game), Slovakia 2 (1),  1 (1), Germany 1 (2).
Group B:  2–0 
Spengler Cup in Davos, Switzerland:
Group Torriani: HC Sparta Praha  3–4  Genève-Servette HC
Standings:  SKA Saint Petersburg 3 points  (1 game), Genève-Servette HC 3 (2), HC Sparta Praha 0 (1).
Group Cattini: Team Canada  6–1  HC Spartak Moscow
Standings:  HC Davos, Team Canada 3 points (1 game), HC Spartak Moscow 0 (2).

December 26, 2010 (Sunday)

American football
NFL Week 16 (division champions in bold, teams assured of playoff berths in italics):
Washington Redskins 20, Jacksonville Jaguars 17 (OT)
Detroit Lions 34, Miami Dolphins 27
St. Louis Rams 25, San Francisco 49ers 17
After the game, the 49ers fire head coach Mike Singletary and name defensive line coach Jim Tomsula as interim replacement.
Kansas City Chiefs 34, Tennessee Titans 14
Chicago Bears 38, New York Jets 34
New England Patriots 34, Buffalo Bills 3
As well as sealing the AFC East, the Patriots clinch the #1 seeding and home-field advantage for the AFC playoffs.
Baltimore Ravens 20, Cleveland Browns 10
Denver Broncos 24, Houston Texans 23
Cincinnati Bengals 34, San Diego Chargers 20
Indianapolis Colts 31, Oakland Raiders 26
Green Bay Packers 45, New York Giants 17
The Giants' loss clinches the NFC East for the Philadelphia Eagles.
Tampa Bay Buccaneers 38, Seattle Seahawks 15
The Minnesota Vikings–Philadelphia Eagles game originally scheduled for today was postponed to December 28 because of concerns over public safety in light of an incoming snowstorm that had been due to hit the Philadelphia metropolitan area prior to kick-off.
NCAA bowl games:
Little Caesars Pizza Bowl in Detroit: FIU 34, Toledo 32
First bowl game appearance and first bowl game win for FIU.

Cricket
England in Australia:
Ashes series:
Fourth Test in Melbourne, day 1:  98 (42.5 overs);  157/0 (47 overs). England lead by 59 runs with 10 wickets remaining in the 1st innings.
Australia's score is their second-lowest total at the MCG, and the lowest score in a home Ashes Test since 1936.
India in South Africa:
2nd Test in Durban, day 1:  183/6 (56 overs); .
Pakistan in New Zealand:
1st T20I in Auckland:  143/9 (20 overs; Tim Southee 5/18);  146/5 (17.1 overs). New Zealand win by 5 wickets; lead 3-match series 1–0.
Southee bowls the third hat-trick in Twenty20 International cricket.

Football (soccer)
AFF Suzuki Cup Final, first leg:
 3–0

Ice hockey
World Junior Championships in Buffalo and Lewiston, United States:
Group A:
 3–4 
 1–2 (OT) 
Group B:
 3–6 
 1–7 
Spengler Cup in Davos, Switzerland:
Group Torriani: Genève-Servette HC  1–3  SKA Saint Petersburg
Group Cattini: HC Davos  4–2  HC Spartak Moscow

December 25, 2010 (Saturday)

American football
NFL Christmas game, Week 16: Arizona Cardinals 27, Dallas Cowboys 26

Handball
Asian Women's Handball Championship in Almaty, Kazakhstan:
3rd place playoff:  25–26  
Final:   33–32  
Kazakhstan win the title for the second time, repeating their 2002 final victory over South Korea.

December 24, 2010 (Friday)

American football
NCAA bowl games:
Hawaii Bowl in Honolulu: Tulsa 62, Hawaii 35

Handball
Asian Women's Handball Championship in Almaty, Kazakhstan:
7th place playoff:  20–30 
5th place playoff:  –

December 23, 2010 (Thursday)

American football
NFL Thursday Night Football, Week 16 (team assured of playoff berth in italics): Pittsburgh Steelers 27, Carolina Panthers 3
NCAA bowl games:
Poinsettia Bowl in San Diego: San Diego State 35, Navy 14

Basketball
Euroleague Regular Season, matchday 10: (teams in bold advance to the Top 16)
Group A:
Caja Laboral  87–71  Partizan Belgrade
Asseco Prokom Gdynia  72–83  Maccabi Tel Aviv
Khimki Moscow  93–89 (OT)  Žalgiris Kaunas
Final standings: Maccabi Tel Aviv 9–1; Caja Laboral, Žalgiris Kaunas, Partizan Belgrade 5–5; Khimki Moscow 4–6; Asseco Prokom Gdynia 2–8.
Group B:
Unicaja Málaga  70–72  Brose Baskets
Real Madrid  94–45  Spirou Basket
Olympiacos Piraeus  89–82  Virtus Roma
Final standings: Olympiacos Piraeus 7–3; Real Madrid 6–4; Unicaja Málaga, Virtus Roma 5–5; Brose Baskets 4–6; Spirou Basket 3–7.
Group C:
Fenerbahçe Ülker  93–61  Cholet Basket
KK Cibona Zagreb  77–94  Lietuvos Rytas
Regal FC Barcelona  73–72  Montepaschi Siena
Final standings: Montepaschi Siena 8–2; Fenerbahçe Ülker, Regal FC Barcelona 7–3; Lietuvos Rytas, Cholet Basket 4–6; KK Cibona Zagreb 0–10.

Handball
Asian Women's Handball Championship in Almaty, Kazakhstan:
Semifinals:
 29–24 
 31–26

December 22, 2010 (Wednesday)

American football
NCAA bowl games:
Maaco Bowl Las Vegas in Whitney, Nevada: Boise State 26, Utah 3

Basketball
Euroleague Regular Season, matchday 10: (teams in bold advance to the Top 16)
Group D:
CSKA Moscow  78–69  Efes Pilsen Istanbul
Power Electronics Valencia  78–77  Union Olimpija Ljubljana
Panathinaikos Athens  93–62  Armani Jeans Milano
Final standings: Panathinaikos Athens 7–3; Union Olimpija Ljubljana 6–4; Efes Pilsen Istanbul, Power Electronics Valencia 5–5; Armani Jeans Milano 4–6; CSKA Moscow 3–7.

Handball
Asian Women's Handball Championship in Almaty, Kazakhstan: (teams in bold advance to the semifinals, and qualify for the 2011 World Championship)
Group A:
 46–17 
 35–31 
Final standings: Kazakhstan 6 points, China 4, North Korea 2, Iran 0.
Group B:  22–22 
Final standings: South Korea, Japan 5 points, Uzbekistan 2, Thailand 0.

December 21, 2010 (Tuesday)

Alpine skiing
Women's World Cup in Courchevel, France:
Slalom:  Marlies Schild  1:34.95  Tanja Poutiainen  1:35.73  Tina Maze  1:36.93
Slalom standings (after 3 of 10 races): (1) Poutiainen & Schild 200 points (3) Maria Pietilä Holmner  174
Overall standings (after 11 of 38 races): (1) Lindsey Vonn  581 points (2) Maria Riesch  578 (3) Elisabeth Görgl  366

American football
NCAA bowl games:
Beef 'O' Brady's Bowl in St. Petersburg, Florida: Louisville 31, Southern Miss 28

Basketball
NCAA women's basketball: Connecticut 93, Florida State 62
The Huskies record their 89th consecutive win, giving them sole possession of the record for longest winning streak in Division I basketball history.

Freestyle skiing
World Cup in Beida Lake, China:
Moguls men:  Mikaël Kingsbury  25.60 points  Guilbaut Colas  24.14  Pierre-Alexandre Rousseau  24.05
Moguls standings (after 3 of 11 events): (1) Colas 240 points (2) Patrick Deneen  202 (3) Kingsbury 195
Overall standings: (1) Colas 48 points (2) Deneen 40 (3) Kingsbury 39
Moguls women:  Hannah Kearney  25.34 points  Jennifer Heil  25.26  Kristi Richards  23.83
Moguls standings (after 3 of 11 events): (1) Kearney 280 points (2) Heil 200 (3) Richards 146
Overall standings: (1) Kearney 56 points (2) Heil 40 (3) Xu Mengtao  36

Handball
Asian Women's Handball Championship in Almaty, Kazakhstan: (teams in bold advance to the semifinals, and qualify for the 2011 World Championship)
Group A:
 33–27 
 35–13 
Standings (after 2 matches): Kazakhstan 4 points, China, North Korea 2, Iran 0.
Group B:
 60–16 
 38–17 
Standings: South Korea, Japan 4 points (2 matches), Uzbekistan 2 (3), Thailand 0 (3).

Rugby union
Heineken Cup pool stage, matchday 4:
Pool 6: Toulouse  36–10  Glasgow Warriors
Standings (after 4 matches): Toulouse 17 points,  London Wasps 15, Glasgow Warriors 4,  Newport Gwent Dragons 1.

Volleyball
FIVB Men's Club World Championship in Doha, Qatar:
3rd place:  Paykan Tehran  3–2  Drean Bolívar
Final:  Trentino BetClic  3–1   Skra Bełchatów
Trentino BetClic win the title for the second straight time.
FIVB Women's Club World Championship in Doha, Qatar:
3rd place: Mirador  1–3   Bergamo
Final:  Fenerbahçe  3–0   Sollys Osasco
Fenerbahçe win the title for the first time.

December 20, 2010 (Monday)

American football
NFL Monday Night Football, Week 15 (division champion in bold): Chicago Bears 40, Minnesota Vikings 14
The game was held at the University of Minnesota's TCF Bank Stadium due to the collapse of the inflatable roof at the Metrodome.

Cricket
India in South Africa:
1st Test in Centurion, day 5:  136 & 459 (128.1 overs; Sachin Tendulkar 111*);  620/4d. South Africa win by an innings & 25 runs; lead 3-match series 1–0.

Equestrianism
Show jumping:
Olympia London International Horse Show in London (CSI 5*-W):
Grand Prix:  Pénélope Leprevost  on Myss Valette  Simon Delestre  on Oslo du Chalet   Malin Baryard-Johnsson  on Reveur de Hurtebise

Handball
Asian Women's Handball Championship in Almaty, Kazakhstan:
Group A:  22–47 
Group B:
 57–22 
 38–11

Rugby union
Heineken Cup pool stage, matchday 4:
Pool 1: Edinburgh  24–22  Castres
Standings (after 4 matches):  Northampton Saints 16 points, Castres 10, Edinburgh 7,  Cardiff Blues 6.
Amlin Challenge Cup pool stage, matchday 4:
Pool 2: Sale Sharks  13–15  Brive in Galashiels
Standings (after 4 matches): Brive 18 points, Sale Sharks 11,  Petrarca 5,  El Salvador 4.

Volleyball
FIVB Men's Club World Championship in Doha, Qatar:
Semifinals:
Trentino BetClic  3–0  Paykan Tehran
Skra Bełchatów  3–0  Drean Bolívar
FIVB Women's Club World Championship in Doha, Qatar:
Semifinals:
Fenerbahçe  3–0  Mirador
Bergamo  0–3  Sollys Osasco

December 19, 2010 (Sunday)

Alpine skiing
Women's World Cup in Val-d'Isère, France:
Super Combined:  Lindsey Vonn  2:07.80  Elisabeth Görgl  2:08.26  Nicole Hosp  2:08.49
Overall standings (after 10 of 38 races): (1) Vonn 581 points (2) Maria Riesch  578 (3) Görgl 366
Men's World Cup in Alta Badia, Italy:
Giant Slalom:  Ted Ligety  2:31.99  Cyprien Richard  2:32.13  Thomas Fanara  2:32.54
Giant slalom standings (after 3 of 7 races): (1) Ligety 300 points (2) Aksel Lund Svindal  165 (3) Richard 142
Overall standings (after 10 of 38 races): (1) Ligety 321 points (2) Silvan Zurbriggen  315 (3) Didier Cuche  & Michael Walchhofer  294

American football
NFL Week 15 (teams assured of playoff berths in italics):
Cincinnati Bengals 19, Cleveland Browns 17
Dallas Cowboys 33, Washington Redskins 30
Tennessee Titans 31, Houston Texans 17
Indianapolis Colts 34, Jacksonville Jaguars 24
Kansas City Chiefs 27, St. Louis Rams 13
Buffalo Bills 17, Miami Dolphins 14
Detroit Lions 23, Tampa Bay Buccaneers 20 (OT)
The Lions win on the road for the first time since , ending the longest road losing streak in NFL history at 26 games.
Carolina Panthers 19, Arizona Cardinals 12
Baltimore Ravens 30, New Orleans Saints 24
Philadelphia Eagles 38, New York Giants 31
The Eagles erase a 21-point deficit in the final 8 minutes, capped by DeSean Jackson's punt return touchdown on the game's final play.
Atlanta Falcons 34, Seattle Seahawks 18
New York Jets 22, Pittsburgh Steelers 17
Oakland Raiders 39, Denver Broncos 23
Sunday Night Football: New England Patriots 31, Green Bay Packers 27

Basketball
Maggie Dixon Classic in New York City: Connecticut 81, Ohio State 50
The Huskies women's team ties the UCLA men's team of 1971 to 1974 for the longest winning streak in NCAA Division I history, at 88 games.

Biathlon
World Cup 3 in Pokljuka, Slovenia:
Mixed Relay:   (Helena Ekholm, Anna Carin Zidek, Fredrik Lindström, Carl Johan Bergman) 1:17:52.0 (0+4+0+6)   (Olena Pidhrushna, Vita Semerenko, Serhiy Semenov, Serguei Sednev) 1:17:52.3 (0+3+0+4)   (Marie-Laure Brunet, Marie Dorin, Vincent Jay, Martin Fourcade) 1:17:53.3 (0+6+0+4)

Bobsleigh
World Cup in Lake Placid, United States:
Four-man:  Steve Holcomb/Justin Olsen/Steven Langton/Curtis Tomasevicz  1:48.01 (53.70 / 54.31)  Maximilian Arndt/Rene Tiefert/Alexander Rödiger/Martin Putze  1:48.59 (54.23 / 54.36)  Lyndon Rush/Justin Wilkinson/Cody Sorensen/Neville Wright  1:48.63 (54.17 / 54.46)
Standings (after 4 of 8 races): (1) Manuel Machata  811 points (2) Holcomb 810 (3) Arndt 804

Cricket
England in Australia:
Ashes series:
Third Test in Perth, day 4:  268 & 309;  187 & 123 (37 overs; Ryan Harris 6/47). Australia win by 267 runs; 5-match series level 1–1.
India in South Africa:
1st Test in Centurion, day 4:  136 & 454/8 (122.2 overs; Sachin Tendulkar 107*);  620/4d. India trail by 30 runs with 2 wickets remaining.
Tendulkar hits the 50th century of his Test career.

Cross-country skiing
World Cup in La Clusaz, France:
Men's 4 x 10 km relay:   (Toni Livers, Dario Cologna, Remo Fischer, Curdin Perl) 1:42:14.6   I (Evgeniy Belov, Alexander Legkov, Petr Sedov, Maxim Vylegzhanin) 1:42:45.4   I (Eldar Rønning, Martin Johnsrud Sundby, Tord Asle Gjerdalen, Petter Northug) 1:42:48.4
Women's 4 x 5 km relay:   I (Vibeke Skofterud, Therese Johaug, Kristin Størmer Steira, Marit Bjørgen) 58:38.7   (Virginia de Martin Topranin, Marianna Longa, Silvia Rupil, Arianna Follis) 59:35.3   (Sara Lindborg, Anna Haag, Maria Rydqvist, Charlotte Kalla) 1:00:02.8

Equestrianism
Show jumping:
FEI World Cup Western European League:
7th competition in London (CSI 5*-W):  Michael Whitaker  on Amai  Billy Twomey  on Tinka's Serenade   Kevin Staut  on Le Prestige de Hus
Standings (after 7 of 13 competitions): (1) Staut 78 points (2) Rolf-Göran Bengtsson  57 (3) Meredith Michaels-Beerbaum  50
CSI 4* Frankfurt:
Grand Prix (Masters League Final):  Janne Friederike Meyer  on Lambrasco  Denis Lynch  on Lantinus  Ludger Beerbaum  on Chaman
Dressage:
FEI World Cup Western European League:
5th competition in Frankfurt (CDI-W):  Ulla Salzgeber  on Herzruf's Erbe  Isabell Werth  on El Santo NRW  Matthias Alexander Rath  on Sterntaler-UNICEF
Standings (after 5 of 10 competitions): (1) Salzgeber & Werth 57 points (3) Catherine Haddad  54

Football (soccer)
AFF Suzuki Cup Semi-finals, second leg (first leg score in parentheses):
 1–0 (1–0) . Indonesia win 2–0 on aggregate.

Freestyle skiing
World Cup in Innichen, Italy:
Ski Cross men:  Scott Kneller   Alex Fiva   John Teller 
Ski Cross standings (after 2 of 11 races): (1) Patrick Gasser  120 points (2) Kneller 112 (3) Andreas Matt  109
Overall standings: (1) Patrick Deneen  & Jia Zongyang  36 points (3) Guilbaut Colas  32
Ski Cross women:  Fanny Smith   Ashleigh McIvor   Heidi Zacher 
Ski Cross standings (after 2 of 11 races): (1) Anna Holmlund  150 points (2) Smith 145 (3) McIvor 116
Overall standings: (1) Hannah Kearney  & Xu Mengtao  36 points (3) Holmlund 30

Golf
European Tour:
South African Open in Durban, South Africa:
Winner: Ernie Els  263 (−25)
Els wins his 26th European Tour title.

Handball
European Women's Championship in Herning, Denmark:
Bronze Medal Match:  15–16  
Romania qualify for the 2011 World Championship.
Final:   25–20  
Norway win the title for the fourth successive time and fifth overall.
Asian Women's Championship in Almaty, Kazakhstan:
Group A:  22–25 
Group B:  25–31

Nordic combined
World Cup in Ramsau, Austria:
HS 98 / 10 km:  Mario Stecher  24:22.3  Tino Edelmann  24:30.9  Eric Frenzel  24:32.5
Overall standings (after 6 of 12 races): (1) Jason Lamy-Chappuis  435 points (2) Stecher 386 (3) Mikko Kokslien  355

Rugby union
Heineken Cup pool stage, matchday 4:
Pool 1:
Edinburgh  –  Castres — postponed to December 20 due to heavy snow in Edinburgh
Cardiff Blues  19–23  Northampton Saints
Standings: Northampton Saints 16 points (4 matches), Castres 9 (3), Cardiff Blues 6 (4), Edinburgh 3 (3).
Pool 5: Leicester Tigers  22–22  Perpignan
Standings (after 4 matches):  Scarlets 15 points, Leicester Tigers 13, Perpignan 12,  Benetton Treviso 1.
Pool 6:
Toulouse  –  Glasgow Warriors — postponed to December 21 due to weather-related travel delays
London Wasps  37–10  Newport Gwent Dragons
Standings: London Wasps 15 points (4 matches), Toulouse 12 (3), Glasgow Warriors 4 (3), Newport Gwent Dragons 1 (4).
Amlin Challenge Cup pool stage, matchday 4:
Pool 2:
Sale Sharks  –  Brive — postponed to December 20 due to frozen pitch
El Salvador  37–16  Petrarca
Standings: Brive 14 points (3 matches), Sale Sharks 10 (3), Petrarca 5 (4), El Salvador 4 (4).
Pool 3: Newcastle Falcons  26–24  Exeter Chiefs in Galashiels
Standings (after 4 matches):  Montpellier 13 points, Exeter Chiefs 11, Newcastle Falcons 8,  Bourgoin 6.
Pool 4: Overmach Parma  6–44  Leeds Carnegie
Standings (after 4 matches):  Stade Français 19 points, Leeds Carnegie 14,  București Oaks 4, Overmach Parma 1.
Pool 5: Gloucester  18–24  La Rochelle
Standings (after 4 matches): La Rochelle,  Agen 15 points, Gloucester 11,  Rovigo 0.

Ski jumping
World Cup in Engelberg, Switzerland:
HS 137:  Andreas Kofler  265.1 points  Thomas Morgenstern  258.8  Adam Małysz  255.1
Standings (after 7 of 26 events): (1) Morgenstern 605 points (2) Kofler 480 (3) Matti Hautamäki  351

Swimming
World Championships (25 m) in Dubai, United Arab Emirates:
Men:
100m freestyle:  César Cielo  45.74 CR  Fabien Gilot  45.97  Nikita Lobintsev  46.35
200m backstroke:  Ryan Lochte  1:46.68 CR  Tyler Clary  1:49.09  Markus Rogan  1:49.96
100m individual medley:  Ryan Lochte  50.86  Markus Deibler  51.69  Sergey Fesikov  51.81
50m breaststroke:  Felipe França Silva  25.95 CR  Cameron van der Burgh  26.03  Aleksander Hetland  26.29
200m butterfly:  Chad le Clos  1:51.56  Kaio de Almeida  1:51.61  László Cseh  1:51.67
1500m freestyle:  Oussama Mellouli  14:24.16  Mads Glæsner  14:29.52  Gergely Gyurta  14:31.47
4 × 100 m medley relay:   (Nick Thoman, Mihail Alexandrov, Ryan Lochte, Garrett Weber-Gale) 3:20.99 CR   (Stanislav Donets 48.95 CR, Stanislav Lakhtyukhov, Yevgeny Korotyshkin, Nikita Lobintsev) 3:21.61   (Guilherme Guido, Felipe França Silva, Kaio de Almeida, César Cielo) 3:23.12
Lochte wins his third gold medal of the day and sixth of the championships.
Women:
50m backstroke:  Zhao Jing  26.27 CR  Rachel Goh  26.54  Mercedes Peris  26.80
200m breaststroke:  Rebecca Soni  2:16.39 CR  Sun Ye  2:18.09  Rikke Møller Pedersen  2:18.82
Soni wins her third gold medal of the championships.
100m butterfly:  Felicity Galvez  55.43 CR  Therese Alshammar  55.73  Dana Vollmer  56.25
50m freestyle:  Ranomi Kromowidjojo  23.37  Hinkelien Schreuder  23.81  Arianna Vanderpool-Wallace  24.04
Kromowidjojo wins her third gold medal of the championships.
200m freestyle:  Camille Muffat  1:52.29 CR  Katie Hoff  1:52.91  Kylie Palmer  1:52.96

December 18, 2010 (Saturday)

Alpine skiing
Men's World Cup in Val Gardena, Italy:
Downhill:  Silvan Zurbriggen  1:57.21  Romed Baumann  1:57.27  Didier Cuche  1:57.31
Downhill standings (after 2 of 9 races): (1) Zurbriggen 150 points (2) Michael Walchhofer  145 (3) Klaus Kröll  90
Overall standings (after 9 of 38 races): (1) Zurbriggen 315 points (2) Walchhofer 294 (3) Baumann 259
Women's World Cup in Val-d'Isère, France:
Downhill:  Lindsey Vonn  1:51.42  Nadja Kamer  1:52.10  Lara Gut  1:52.22
Downhill standings (after 3 of 9 races): (1) Vonn 260 points (2) Maria Riesch  207 (3) Elisabeth Görgl  155
Overall standings (after 9 of 38 races): (1) Riesch 533 points (2) Vonn 481 (3) Görgl 286

American football
NCAA bowl games:
New Mexico Bowl in Albuquerque: BYU 52, UTEP 24
Humanitarian Bowl in Boise, Idaho: Northern Illinois 40, Fresno State 17
New Orleans Bowl in New Orleans: Troy 48, Ohio 21
NCAA Division I Football Championship (FCS) Semifinal (seed in parentheses): (3) Delaware 27, Georgia Southern 10
NCAA Division II National Football Championship in Florence, Alabama: Minnesota-Duluth 20, Delta State 17
The Bulldogs win their second national championship in three years.
NCAA Division III National Football Championship in Salem, Virginia: Wisconsin-Whitewater 31, Mount Union 21
The Warhawks win their third national title in four years, taking them to 3–3 in the two teams' six consecutive matchups.

Biathlon
World Cup 3 in Pokljuka, Slovenia:
Men's 10 km Sprint:  Björn Ferry  27:25.9 (0+0)  Tarjei Bø  27:31.0 (1+0)  Michael Greis  27:34.6 (0+0)
Sprint standings (after 3 of 10 races): (1) Bø 154 points (2) Emil Hegle Svendsen  127 (3) Ole Einar Bjørndalen  115
Overall standings (after 7 of 26 races): (1) Bø 329 points (2) Svendsen 306 (3) Bjørndalen 265
Women's 7.5 km Sprint:  Magdalena Neuner  23:05.2 (0+2)  Anastasiya Kuzmina  23:16.4 (0+1)  Kaisa Mäkäräinen  23:22.2 (1+0)  Olga Zaitseva  23:22.2 (0+0)
Sprint standings (after 3 of 10 races): (1) Mäkäräinen 156 points (2) Darya Domracheva  122 (3) Helena Ekholm  & Kuzmina 116
Overall standings (after 7 of 26 races): (1) Mäkäräinen 354 points (2) Ekholm 289 (3) Anna Carin Zidek  257

Bobsleigh
World Cup in Lake Placid, United States:
Two-man:  Simone Bertazzo/Sergio Riva  1:51.40 (55.61 / 55.79)  Alexandr Zubkov/Dmitry Trunenkov  1:51.44 (55.63 / 55.81)  Karl Angerer/Alex Mann  1:51.53 (55.53 / 56.00)
Standings (after 4 of 8 races): (1) Manuel Machata  811 points (2) Zubkov 803 (3) Bertazzo 747
Women:  Sandra Kiriasis/Stephanie Schneider  1:54.08 (57.06 / 57.02)  Cathleen Martini/Christin Senkel  1:54.41 (57.08 / 57.33)  Helen Upperton/Shelley-Ann Brown  1:54.60 (57.34 / 57.26)
Standings (after 4 of 8 races): (1) Kiriasis 885 points (2) Martini 827 (3) Bree Schaaf  720

Cricket
England in Australia:
Ashes series:
Third Test in Perth, day 3:  268 & 309 (86 overs; Michael Hussey 116, Chris Tremlett 5/87);  187 & 81/5 (27 overs). England require another 310 runs with 5 wickets remaining.
India in South Africa:
1st Test in Centurion, day 3:  136 & 190/2 (44.1 overs);  620/4d (130.1 overs; Jacques Kallis 201*, Hashim Amla 140, AB de Villiers 129). India trail by 294 runs with 8 wickets remaining.

Cross-country skiing
World Cup in La Clusaz, France:
Men's 30 km Freestyle Mass Start:  Maxim Vylegzhanin  1:18:53.5  Petter Northug  1:18:53.6  Alexander Legkov  1:18:53.9
Distance standings (after 5 of 17 races): (1) Legkov 293 points (2) Dario Cologna  244 (3) Vylegzhanin 235
Overall standings (after 9 of 31 races): (1) Legkov 493 points (2) Cologna 471 (3) Vylegzhanin 325
Women's 15 km Freestyle Mass Start:  Marit Bjørgen  42:29.6  Justyna Kowalczyk  42:30.6   Kristin Størmer Steira  42:40.5
Distance standings (after 5 of 17 races): (1) Bjørgen 410 points (2) Kowalczyk 315 (3) Therese Johaug  177
Overall standings (after 9 of 31 races): (1) Bjørgen 760 points (2) Kowalczyk 539 (3) Arianna Follis  414

Football (soccer)
AFF Suzuki Cup Semi-finals, second leg (first leg score in parentheses):
 0–0 (0–2) . Malaysia win 2–0 on aggregate.
FIFA Club World Cup in the United Arab Emirates:
Third place playoff:  Internacional  4–2  Seongnam Ilhwa Chunma
Final:  TP Mazembe  0–3   Internazionale
Internazionale win the Cup for the first time and become the fourth successive European team to win the tournament.

Freestyle skiing
World Cup in Beida Lake, China:
Aerials men:  Qi Guangpu  245.74 points  Jia Zongyang  245.17  Renato Ulrich  232.72
Aerials standings (after 2 of 8 events): (1) Jia 180 points (2) Qi 136 (3) Warren Shouldice  130
Overall standings: (1) Patrick Deneen  & Jia 36 points (3) Guilbaut Colas  32
Aerials women:  Xu Mengtao  181.53 points  Cheng Shuan  176.95  Xu Sicun  162.14
Aerials standings (after 2 of 8 events): (1) Xu Mengtao 180 points (2) Zhang Xin  & Cheng 140
Overall standings: (1) Hannah Kearney  & Xu Mengtao 36 points (3) Zhang & Cheng 28
World Cup in Innichen, Italy:
Ski Cross men:  Patrick Gasser   Andreas Matt   Thomas Zangerl 
Ski Cross women:  Anna Holmlund   Kelsey Serwa   Nikol Kucerova

Handball
European Women's Championship in Herning, Denmark:
5th Place Match:  19–23 
Semifinals: (winners qualify for 2011 World Championship)
 23–25 
 19–29

Luge
World Cup in Park City, United States:
Men's singles:  Armin Zöggeler  1:30.740 (45.301 / 45.439)  Andi Langenhan  1:30.992 (45.502 / 45.490)  Viktor Kneyb  1:31.097 (45.510 / 45.587)
Standings (after 4 of 9 races): (1) Zöggeler 370 points (2) Felix Loch  290 (3) David Möller  264
Doubles:  Andreas Linger/Wolfgang Linger  1:27.331 (43.710 / 43.621)  Peter Penz/Georg Fischler  1:27.331 (43.656 / 43.675)  Tobias Wendl/Tobias Arlt  1:27.474 (43.790 / 43.684)
Standings (after 4 of 9 races): (1) Wendl 330 points (2) Christian Oberstolz  315 (3) Penz 280

Nordic combined
World Cup in Ramsau, Austria:
HS 98 / 4 x 5 km:  Mario Stecher  25:46.4  Björn Kircheisen  25:47.3  Johannes Rydzek  26:01.9
Overall standings (after 5 of 12 races): (1) Jason Lamy-Chappuis  385 points (2) Mikko Kokslien  329 (3) Stecher 286

Rugby union
Heineken Cup pool stage, matchday 4:
Pool 2: Leinster  24–8  Clermont
Standings (after 4 matches): Leinster 14 points,  Racing Métro, Clermont 9,  Saracens 6.
Pool 3:
Ospreys  19–15  Munster
Toulon  38–17  London Irish
Standings (after 4 matches): Toulon 13 points, Munster 11, Ospreys 10, London Irish 5.
Pool 4: Bath  22–26  Ulster
Standings (after 4 matches):  Biarritz 16 points, Ulster 13, Bath 8,  Aironi 4.
Pool 5: Benetton Treviso  15–38  Scarlets
Standings: Scarlets 15 points (4 matches),  Leicester Tigers 11 (3),  Perpignan 10 (3), Benetton Treviso 1 (4).
Amlin Challenge Cup pool stage, matchday 4:
Pool 3: Bourgoin  36–18  Montpellier
Standings: Montpellier 13 points (4 matches),  Exeter Chiefs 10 (3), Bourgoin 6 (4),  Newcastle Falcons 4 (3).
Pool 5: Agen  61–11  Rovigo
Standings: Agen 15 points (4 matches),  La Rochelle 11 (3),  Gloucester 10 (3), Rovigo 0 (4).

Ski jumping
World Cup in Engelberg, Switzerland:
HS 137:  Thomas Morgenstern  291.0 points  Adam Małysz  288.8  Matti Hautamäki  284.8
Standings (after 6 of 26 events): (1) Morgenstern 525 points (2) Andreas Kofler  380 (3) Ville Larinto  321

Snowboarding
World Cup in Telluride, United States:
Snowboard Cross men (team):  Luca Matteotti/Alberto Schiavon   Alex Deibold/Jonathan Cheever   Nick Baumgartner/Jayson Hale 
Snowboard Cross women (team):  Aleksandra Zhekova /Helene Olafsen   Maria Ramberger/Susanne Moll   Lindsey Jacobellis/Callan Chythlook-Sifsof

Swimming
World Championships (25 m) in Dubai, United Arab Emirates:
Men's:
50m backstroke:  Stanislav Donets  22.93 CR  Sun Xiaolei  23.13  Aschwin Wildeboer  23.13
50m butterfly:  Albert Subirats  22.40 CR  Andriy Govorov  22.43  Steffen Deibler  22.44
Women's:
100m breaststroke:  Rebecca Soni  1:03.98 CR  Leisel Jones  1:04.26  Ji Liping  1:04.79
200m individual medley:  Mireia Belmonte García  2:05.73 CR  Ye Shiwen  2:05.94  Ariana Kukors  2:06.09
Belmonte García wins her third gold medal of the championships.
4 × 100 m freestyle relay:   (Femke Heemskerk, Inge Dekker, Hinkelien Schreuder, Ranomi Kromowidjojo) 3:28.54 CR   (Natalie Coughlin, Katie Hoff, Jessica Hardy, Dana Vollmer) 3:29.34   (Tang Yi, Zhu Qianwei, Pang Jiaying, Li Zhesi) 3:29.81

December 17, 2010 (Friday)

Alpine skiing
Men's World Cup in Val Gardena, Italy:
Super-G:  Michael Walchhofer  1:34.35  Stephan Keppler  1:35.02  Erik Guay  1:35.16
Super-G standings (after 3 of 7 races): (1) Walchhofer 149 points (2) Georg Streitberger  147 (3) Tobias Grünenfelder  130
Overall standings (after 8 of 38 races): (1) Walchhofer 249 points (2) Benjamin Raich  238 (3) Aksel Lund Svindal  236
Women's World Cup in Val-d'Isère, France:
Super-G: Cancelled due to heavy snow.

American football
NCAA Division I Football Championship (FCS) Semifinal (seed in parentheses): (5) Eastern Washington 41, Villanova 31

Bobsleigh
World Cup in Lake Placid, United States:
Women:  Sandra Kiriasis/Berit Wiacker  1:53.94 (56.90 / 57.04)  Shauna Rohbock/Valerie Fleming  1:54.31 (57.27 / 57.04)  Cathleen Martini/Kristin Steinert  1:54.58 (57.39 / 57.19)
Standings (after 3 of 8 races): (1) Kiriasis 660 points (2) Martini 617 (3) Rohbock 580

Cricket
England in Australia:
Ashes series:
Third Test in Perth, day 2:  268 & 119/3 (33 overs);  187 (62.3 overs; Mitchell Johnson 6/38). Australia lead by 200 runs with 7 wickets remaining.
India in South Africa:
1st Test in Centurion, day 2:  136 (38.4 overs; Morné Morkel 5/20);  366/2 (87 overs; Hashim Amla 116*, Jacques Kallis 102*). South Africa lead by 230 runs with 8 wickets remaining in the 1st innings.

Freestyle skiing
World Cup in Beida Lake, China:
Aerials men:  Jia Zongyang  230.49 points  Warren Shouldice  210.47  Wu Chao  205.10
Overall standings: (1) Patrick Deneen  36 points (2) Guilbaut Colas  27 (3) Jia 20
Aerials women:  Zhang Xin  197.04 points  Xu Mengtao  185.76  Cheng Shuang  164.61
Overall standings: (1) Hannah Kearney  36 points (2) Yulia Galysheva  27 (3) Jennifer Heil  24

Luge
World Cup in Park City, United States:
Women's singles:  Tatjana Hüfner  1:27.075 (43.602 / 43.473)  Anke Wischnewski  1:27.159 (43.650 / 43.509)  Alex Gough  1:27.346 (43.718 / 43.628)
Standings (after 4 of 9 races): (1) Hüfner 400 points (2) Natalie Geisenberger  & Wischnewski 290

Rugby union
Heineken Cup pool stage, matchday 4:
Pool 2: Racing Métro  14–19  Saracens
Standings:  Leinster 10 points (3 matches), Racing Métro 9 (4),  Clermont 9 (3), Saracens 6 (4).
Pool 4: Biarritz  34–3  Aironi
Standings: Biarritz 16 points (4 matches),  Ulster 9 (3),  Bath 7 (3), Aironi 4 (4).
Amlin Challenge Cup pool stage, matchday 4:
Pool 1: Connacht  9–15  Harlequins
Standings: Harlequins 14 points (4 matches),  Bayonne 10 (3), Connacht 6 (4),  Cavalieri Prato 4 (3).

Skeleton
World Cup in Lake Placid, United States:
Men:  Sergey Chudinov  1:48.51 (54.21 / 54.30)  Martins Dukurs  1:48.55 (54.15 / 54.40)  Kristan Bromley  1:48.74 (54.25 / 54.49)
Standings (after 4 of 8 events): (1) Dukurs 819 points (2) Bromley 802 (3) Aleksandr Tretyakov  755
Women:  Marion Thees  1:51.95 (55.86 / 56.09)  Shelley Rudman  1:52.28 (56.17 / 56.11)  Anja Huber  1:52.48 (56.06 / 56.42)
Standings (after 4 of 8 events): (1) Huber 850 points (2) Rudman 814 (3) Thees 802

Ski jumping
World Cup in Engelberg, Switzerland:
HS 137:  Thomas Morgenstern  134.4 points  Andreas Kofler  132.2  Wolfgang Loitzl  128.6
Standings (after 5 of 26 events): (1) Morgenstern 425 points (2) Kofler 330 (3) Ville Larinto  276

Snowboarding
World Cup in Telluride, United States:
Snowboard Cross men:  Pierre Vaultier   Seth Wescott   Alex Pullin 
Snowboard Cross standings (after 3 of 7 races): (1) Vaultier 1590 points (2) Pullin 1450 (3) Luca Matteotti  1280
Overall standings: (1) Andreas Prommegger  2540 points (2) Roland Fischnaller  2310 (3) Rok Flander  2110
Snowboard Cross women:  Dominique Maltais   Aleksandra Zhekova   Maëlle Ricker 
Snowboard Cross standings (after 3 of 7 races): (1) Maltais 3000 points (2) Ricker 2200 (3) Zhekova 1800
Overall standings: (1) Maltais 3000 points (3) Yekaterina Tudegesheva  2890 (3) Fränzi Mägert-Kohli  2750

Swimming
World Championships (25 m) in Dubai, United Arab Emirates:
Men's:
200m breaststroke:  Naoya Tomita  2:03.12 CR  Dániel Gyurta  2:03.47  Brenton Rickard  2:04.33
400m freestyle:  Paul Biedermann  3:37.06  Nikita Lobintsev  3:37.84  Oussama Mellouli  3:38.17
50m freestyle:  César Cielo  20.51 CR  Frédérick Bousquet  20.81  Josh Schneider  20.88
200m individual medley:  Ryan Lochte  1:50.08 WR  Markus Rogan  1:52.90  Tyler Clary  1:53.56
Women's:
100m freestyle:  Ranomi Kromowidjojo  51.45 CR  Femke Heemskerk  52.18  Natalie Coughlin  52.25
200m backstroke:  Alexianne Castel  2:01.67  Missy Franklin  2:02.01  Zhou Yanxin  2:03.22
50m butterfly:  Therese Alshammar  24.87 CR  Felicity Galvez  24.90  Jeanette Ottesen  25.24
400m freestyle:  Katie Hoff  3:57.07 CR  Kylie Palmer  3:58.39  Federica Pellegrini  3:59.52
100m individual medley:  Ariana Kukors  58.95  Kotuku Ngawati  59.27  Hinkelien Schreuder  59.53
4 × 100 m medley relay:   (Zhao Jing, Zhao Jin, Liu Zige, Tang Yi) 3:48.29 CR   (Natalie Coughlin, Rebecca Soni, Dana Vollmer, Jessica Hardy) 3:48.36   (Rachel Goh, Leisel Jones, Felicity Galvez, Marieke Guehrer) 3:48.88

December 16, 2010 (Thursday)

American football
NFL Thursday Night Football, Week 15: San Diego Chargers 34, San Francisco 49ers 7

Basketball
Euroleague Regular Season, matchday 9: (teams in bold advance to the Top 16)
Group A: Maccabi Tel Aviv  80–76  Khimki Moscow
Standings (after 9 games): Maccabi Tel Aviv 8–1;  Žalgiris Kaunas,  Partizan Belgrade 5–4;  Caja Laboral 4–5; Khimki Moscow 3–6;  Asseco Prokom Gdynia 2–7.
Group C:
Montepaschi Siena  94–65  Fenerbahçe Ülker
Lietuvos Rytas  88–87  Regal FC Barcelona
Standings (after 9 games): Montepaschi Siena 8–1; Fenerbahçe Ülker, Regal FC Barcelona 6–3;  Cholet Basket 4–5; Lietuvos Rytas 3–6;  KK Cibona Zagreb 0–9.
Group D: Armani Jeans Milano  60–75  Power Electronics Valencia
Standings (after 9 games):  Panathinaikos Athens,  Union Olimpija Ljubljana 6–3;  Efes Pilsen Istanbul 5–4; Power Electronics Valencia, Armani Jeans Milano 4–5;  CSKA Moscow 2–7.

Biathlon
World Cup 3 in Pokljuka, Slovenia:
Men's 20 km Individual:  Daniel Mesotitsch  52:05.6 (1+0+0+0)  Benjamin Weger  53:04.0 (0+0+1+0)  Serguei Sednev  53:26.8 (1+0+0+1)
Individual standings (after 2 of 4 races): (1) Mesotitsch 91 points (2) Emil Hegle Svendsen  85 (3) Sednev 75
Overall standings (after 6 of 26 races): (1) Svendsen 282 points (2) Tarjei Bø  275 (3) Ole Einar Bjørndalen  235
Women's 15 km Individual:  Tora Berger  42:47.0 (0+0+0+0)  Kaisa Mäkäräinen  42:48.8 (0+0+0+1)  Marie-Laure Brunet  43:22.3 (0+0+0+0)
Individual standings (after 2 of 4 races): (1) Brunet 102 points (2) Anna Carin Zidek  96 (3) Valj Semerenko  86
Overall standings (after 6 of 26 races): (1) Mäkäräinen 306 points (2) Helena Ekholm  253 (3) Zidek 240

Cricket
England in Australia:
Ashes series:
Third Test in Perth, day 1:  268 (76 overs);  29/0 (12 overs). England trail by 239 runs with 10 wickets remaining in the 1st innings.
India in South Africa:
1st Test in Centurion, day 1:  136/9 (38.1 overs); .

Football (soccer)
AFF Suzuki Cup Semi-finals, first leg:
 0–1 
UEFA Europa League group stage, matchday 6: (teams in bold advance to the Round of 32)
Group A:
Red Bull Salzburg  0–1  Lech Poznań
Juventus  1–1  Manchester City
Final standings: Manchester City, Lech Poznań 11 points, Juventus 6, Red Bull Salzburg 2.
Group B:
Aris  2–0  Rosenborg
Bayer Leverkusen  1–1  Atlético Madrid
Final standings: Bayer Leverkusen 12 points, Aris 10, Atlético Madrid 8, Rosenborg 3.
Group C:
Lille  3–0  Gent
Levski Sofia  1–0  Sporting CP
Final standings: Sporting CP 12 points, Lille 8, Gent, Levski Sofia 7.
Group G:
Anderlecht  2–0  Hajduk Split
AEK Athens  0–3  Zenit St. Petersburg
Final standings: Zenit St. Petersburg 18 points, Anderlecht, AEK Athens 7, Hajduk Split 3.
Group H:
Stuttgart  5–1  Odense
Getafe  1–0  Young Boys
Final standings: Stuttgart 15 points, Young Boys 9, Getafe 7, Odense 4.
Group I:
Debrecen  2–0  Sampdoria
PSV Eindhoven  0–0  Metalist Kharkiv
Final standings: PSV Eindhoven 14 points, Metalist Kharkiv 11, Sampdoria 5, Debrecen 3.

Handball
European Women's Championship in Denmark and Norway: (teams in bold advance to the semifinals)
Group I in Herning:
 20–35 
 22–23 
 29–30 
Final standings: Denmark 8 points, Romania, Montenegro 6, Russia, Croatia 4, Spain 2.

Rugby union
Amlin Challenge Cup pool stage, matchday 4:
Pool 4: Stade Français  35–7  București Oaks
Standings: Stade Français 19 points (4 matches),  Leeds Carnegie 9 (3), București Oaks 4 (4),  Overmach Parma 1 (3)

Snowboarding
World Cup in Telluride, United States:
Parallel Giant Slalom men:  Rok Flander   Kaspar Flütsch   Manuel Veith 
Parallel Slalom standings (after 4 of 12 races): (1) Andreas Prommegger  2540 points (2) Roland Fischnaller  2310 (3) Flander 2110
Overall standings: (1) Prommegger 2540 points (2) Fischnaller 2310 (3) Flander 2110
Parallel Giant Slalom women:  Fränzi Mägert-Kohli   Isabella Laböck   Yekaterina Tudegesheva 
Parallel Slalom standings (after 4 of 12 races): (1) Tudegesheva 2890 points (2) Mägert-Kohli 2750 (3) Alena Zavarzina  1878
Overall standings: (1) Tudegesheva 2890 points (2) Mägert-Kohli 2750 (3) Dominique Maltais  2000

Swimming
World Championships (25 m) in Dubai, United Arab Emirates:
Men's:
400m individual medley:  Ryan Lochte  3:55.50 WR  Oussama Mellouli  3:57.40  Tyler Clary  3:57.56
100m backstroke:  Stanislav Donets  49.07 CR  Camille Lacourt  49.80  Aschwin Wildeboer  50.04
100m breaststroke:  Cameron van der Burgh  56.80 CR  Fabio Scozzoli  57.13  Felipe França Silva  57.39
100m butterfly:  Yevgeny Korotyshkin  50.23  Albert Subirats  50.24  Kaio de Almeida  50.33
4 × 200 m freestyle relay:   (Nikita Lobintsev, Danila Izotov, Yevgeny Lagunov, Alexander Sukhorukov) 6:49.04 WR   (Peter Vanderkaay, Ryan Lochte, Garrett Weber-Gale, Ricky Berens) 6:49.58   (Yannick Agnel, Fabien Gilot, Clément Lefert, Jérémy Stravius) 6:53.05
Women's:
50m breaststroke:  Rebecca Soni  29.83  Leiston Pickett  29.84  Zhao Jin  29.90
100m backstroke:  Natalie Coughlin  56.08 CR  Zhao Jing  56.18  Gao Chang  56.21
800m freestyle:  Erika Villaécija García  8:11.61  Mireia Belmonte García  8:12.48  Kate Ziegler  8:12.84

December 15, 2010 (Wednesday)

Basketball
Euroleague Regular Season, matchday 9: (teams in bold advance to the Top 16)
Group A:
Žalgiris Kaunas  89–95 (OT)  Caja Laboral
Partizan Belgrade  61–59  Asseco Prokom Gdynia
Standings:  Maccabi Tel Aviv 7–1; Žalgiris Kaunas, Partizan Belgrade 5–4; Caja Laboral 4–5;  Khimki Moscow 3–5; Asseco Prokom Gdynia 2–7.
Group B:
Brose Baskets  82–75  Real Madrid
Virtus Roma  81–75  Unicaja Málaga
Standings (after 9 games):  Olympiacos Piraeus 6–3; Real Madrid, Unicaja Málaga, Virtus Roma 5–4;  Spirou Basket, Brose Baskets 3–6.
Group C: Cholet Basket  81–65  KK Cibona Zagreb
Standings:  Montepaschi Siena 7–1;  Fenerbahçe Ülker,  Regal FC Barcelona 6–2; Cholet Basket 4–5;  Lietuvos Rytas 2–6; KK Cibona Zagreb 0–9.
Group D:
Efes Pilsen Istanbul  79–78  Panathinaikos Athens
Union Olimpija Ljubljana  81–72  CSKA Moscow
Standings: Panathinaikos Athens, Union Olimpija Ljubljana 6–3; Efes Pilsen Istanbul 5–4;  Armani Jeans Milano 4–4;  Power Electronics Valencia 3–5; CSKA Moscow 2–7.

Equestrianism
Dressage:
FEI World Cup Western European League:
4th competition in London (CDI-W):  Adelinde Cornelissen  on Parzival  Laura Bechtolsheimer  on Mistral Hojris  Edward Gal  on Sisther de Jeu
Standings (after 4 of 10 competitions): (1) Catherine Haddad  54 points (2) Richard Davison  44 (3) Cornelissen 43

Football (soccer)
AFF Suzuki Cup Semi-finals, first leg:
 2–0 
FIFA Club World Cup in the United Arab Emirates:
Fifth place playoff: Al-Wahda  2–2 (2–4 pen.)  Pachuca
Semifinals: Seongnam Ilhwa Chunma  0–3  Internazionale
UEFA Europa League group stage, matchday 6: (teams in bold advance to the Round of 32)
Group D:
Dinamo Zagreb  0–1  PAOK
Club Brugge  1–2  Villarreal
Final standings: Villarreal 12 points, PAOK 11, Dinamo Zagreb 7, Club Brugge 3.
Group E:
AZ  3–0  BATE
Dynamo Kyiv  0–0  Sheriff Tiraspol
Final standings: Dynamo Kyiv 11 points, BATE 10, AZ 7, Sheriff Tiraspol 5.
Group F:
Sparta Prague  1–1  CSKA Moscow
Lausanne-Sport  0–1  Palermo
Final standings: CSKA Moscow 16 points, Sparta Prague 9, Palermo 7, Lausanne-Sport 1.
Group J:
Karpaty Lviv  1–1  Paris Saint-Germain
Sevilla  2–2  Borussia Dortmund
Final standings: Paris Saint-Germain 12 points, Sevilla 10, Borussia Dortmund 9, Karpaty Lviv 1.
Group K:
Napoli  1–0  Steaua București
Liverpool  0–0  Utrecht
Final standings: Liverpool 10 points, Napoli 7, Steaua București 6, Utrecht 5.
Group L:
Beşiktaş  2–0  Rapid Wien
Porto  3–1  CSKA Sofia
Final standings: Porto 16 points, Beşiktaş 13, Rapid Wien, CSKA Sofia 3.

Freestyle skiing
World Cup in Méribel, France:
Dual Moguls Men:  Guilbaut Colas   Patrick Deneen   Bryon Wilson 
Moguls standings (after 2 of 11 events): (1) Deneen 180 points (2) Colas 160 (3) Mikaël Kingsbury  95
Overall standings: (1) Deneen 36 points (2) Colas 32 (3) Kingsbury 19
Dual Moguls Women:  Yulia Galysheva   Hannah Kearney   Justine Dufour-Lapointe 
Moguls standings (after 2 of 11 events): (1) Kearney 180 points (2) Galysheva 136 (3) Jennifer Heil  120
Overall standings: (1) Kearney 36 points (2) Galysheva 27 (3) Heil 24

Handball
European Women's Championship in Denmark and Norway: (teams in bold advance to the semifinals)
Group II in Lillehammer:
 19–31 
 24–19 
 13–35 
Final standings: Sweden, Norway 8 points, France 6, Netherlands, Hungary 4, Ukraine 0.

Swimming
World Championships (25 m) in Dubai, United Arab Emirates:
Men's:
200m freestyle:  Ryan Lochte  1:41.08 CR  Danila Izotov  1:41.70  Oussama Mellouli  1:42.02
4 × 100 m freestyle relay:   (Alain Bernard, Frédérick Bousquet, Fabien Gilot, Yannick Agnel) 3:04.78 CR   (Yevgeny Lagunov, Sergey Fesikov, Nikita Lobintsev, Danila Izotov) 3:04.82   (Nicholas Santos, César Cielo, Marcelo Chierighini, Nicolas Oliveira) 3:05.74
Women's:
200m butterfly:  Mireia Belmonte García  2:03.59 CR  Jemma Lowe  2:03.94  Petra Granlund  2:04.38
400m individual medley:  Mireia Belmonte García  4:24.21 CR  Ye Shiwen  4:24.55  Li Xuanxu  4:29.05
4 × 200 m freestyle relay:   (Chen Qian, Tang Yi, Liu Jing, Zhu Qianwei) 7:35.94 WR   (Blair Evans, Jade Neilsen, Kelly Stubbins, Kylie Palmer) 7:37.57   (Camille Muffat, Coralie Balmy, Mylène Lazare, Ophélie Cyrielle Etienne) 7:38.33

December 14, 2010 (Tuesday)

Football (soccer)
FIFA Club World Cup in the United Arab Emirates:
Semifinals: TP Mazembe  2–0  Internacional
TP Mazembe become the first African team to reach the final.

Handball
European Women's Championship in Denmark and Norway: (teams in bold advance to the semifinals)
Group I in Herning:
 23–21 
 30–22 
 31–19 
Standings (after 4 matches): Denmark 8 points, Romania 6, Montenegro 4, Spain, Russia, Croatia 2.
Group II in Lillehammer:
 27–19 
 21–22 
 19–32 
Standings (after 4 matches): Norway, Sweden 6 points, Netherlands, France, Hungary 4, Ukraine 0.

December 13, 2010 (Monday)

American football
NFL, Week 14:
New York Giants 21, Minnesota Vikings 3 in Detroit
Brett Favre's 18-year regular season consecutive start streak ends at 297 games, as a sprained SC joint rules him inactive for the Vikings.
Monday Night Football: Baltimore Ravens 34, Houston Texans 28 (OT)

Basketball
Euroleague Regular Season, matchday 9: (teams in bold advance to the Top 16)
Group B: Spirou Basket  67–80  Olympiacos Piraeus
Standings: Olympiacos Piraeus 6–3;  Real Madrid,  Unicaja Málaga 5–3;  Virtus Roma 4–4; Spirou Basket 3–6;  Brose Baskets 2–6.

Handball
European Women's Championship in Denmark and Norway:
Group I in Herning:
 20–22 
 31–22 
 26–20 
Standings (after 3 games): Denmark 6 points, Romania, Montenegro 4, Russia, Croatia 2, Spain 0.

December 12, 2010 (Sunday)

Alpine skiing
Men's World Cup in Val-d'Isère, France:
Slalom:  Marcel Hirscher  1:44.70  Benjamin Raich  1:45.01  Steve Missillier  1:45.26
Slalom standings (after 2 of 10 races): (1) Jean-Baptiste Grange  & Hirscher 100 points (3) Silvan Zurbriggen  90
Overall standings (after 7 of 38 races): (1) Aksel Lund Svindal  236 points (2) Ted Ligety  221 (3) Hirscher 200
Women's World Cup in St. Moritz, Switzerland:
Giant slalom:  Tessa Worley  2:10.70  Tanja Poutiainen  2:10.71  Tina Maze  2:11.01
Giant slalom standings (after 3 of 8 races): (1) Worley 232 points (2) Viktoria Rebensburg  206 (3) Poutiainen 156
Overall standings (after 8 of 38 races): (1) Maria Riesch  526 points (2) Lindsey Vonn  381 (3) Poutiainen 276

American football
NFL Week 14 (team assured of playoff berth in italics):
Buffalo Bills 13, Cleveland Browns 6
Pittsburgh Steelers 23, Cincinnati Bengals 7
Detroit Lions 7, Green Bay Packers 3
Tampa Bay Buccaneers 17, Washington Redskins 16
Atlanta Falcons 31, Carolina Panthers 10
Jacksonville Jaguars 38, Oakland Raiders 31
San Francisco 49ers 40, Seattle Seahawks 21
New Orleans Saints 31, St. Louis Rams 13
Miami Dolphins 10, New York Jets 6
Arizona Cardinals 43, Denver Broncos 13
San Diego Chargers 31, Kansas City Chiefs 0
New England Patriots 36, Chicago Bears 7
Sunday Night Football: Philadelphia Eagles 30, Dallas Cowboys 27
The New York Giants–Minnesota Vikings game originally scheduled for today was postponed to Monday because the Giants were unable to fly to Minneapolis due to a severe winter storm in the area. The game has since been moved to Ford Field in Detroit after the storm caused the roof of the Metrodome to deflate.

Badminton
BWF Super Series:
Hong Kong Super Series in Hong Kong:
Men's singles: Lee Chong Wei  def. Taufik Hidayat  21–9, 21–9
Women's singles: Saina Nehwal  def. Wang Shixian  15–21, 21–16, 21–17
Men's doubles: Ko Sung-hyun /Yoo Yeon-seong  def. Markis Kido /Hendra Setiawan  21–19, 14–21, 23–21
Women's doubles: Wang Xiaoli /Yu Yang  def. Cheng Wen-hsing /Chien Yu-chin  21–11, 21–12
Mixed doubles: Joachim Fischer Nielsen /Christinna Pedersen  def. Zhang Nan /Zhao Yunlei  22–20, 14–21, 22–20

Biathlon
World Cup 2 in Hochfilzen, Austria:
Men's 4 x 7.5 km Relay:   (Alexander Os/Ole Einar Bjørndalen/Emil Hegle Svendsen/Tarjei Bø) 1:29:38.2 (1+5+0+2)   (Daniel Mesotitsch/Tobias Eberhard/Christoph Sumann/Dominik Landertinger) 1:30:31.3 (0+1+0+3)   (Vincent Jay/Jean-Guillaume Béatrix/Lois Habert/Martin Fourcade) 1:33:07.0 (1+5+1+4)
Women's 10 km Pursuit:  Helena Ekholm  35:17.8 (0+1+0+0)  Kaisa Mäkäräinen  35:49.8 (0+0+0+2)  Darya Domracheva  36:04.1 (0+0+1+2)
Pursuit standings (after 2 of 7 races): (1) Mäkäräinen 114 points (2) Ekholm 108 (3) Anna Carin Zidek  83
Overall standings (after 5 of 26 races): (1) Mäkäräinen 252 points (2) Ekholm 236 (3) Zidek 204

Cricket
Zimbabwe in Bangladesh:
5th ODI in Chittagong:  188/6 (50 overs);  189/4 (43 overs). Bangladesh win by 6 wickets; win 5-match series 3–1.

Cross-country skiing
World Cup in Davos, Switzerland:
Men's Sprint Freestyle:  Emil Jönsson   Alexei Petukhov   Dario Cologna 
Sprint standings (after 3 of 11 races): (1) Jönsson 230 points (2) Fulvio Scola  138 (3) Petukhov 136
Overall standings (after 8 of 31 races): (1) Cologna 421 points (2) Alexander Legkov  398 (3) Marcus Hellner  301
Women's Sprint Freestyle:  Marit Bjørgen   Arianna Follis   Kikkan Randall 
Sprint standings (after 3 of 11 races): (1) Follis 210 points (2) Bjørgen 150 (3) Randall 140
Overall standings (after 8 of 31 races): (1) Bjørgen 640 points (2) Justyna Kowalczyk  429 (3) Follis 364

Equestrianism
Show jumping:
FEI World Cup:
Western European League:
6th competition in Le Grand-Saconnex/Geneva (CSI 5*-W):  Kevin Staut  on Silvana  Eric Lamaze  on Hickstead  Rolf-Göran Bengtsson  on Quintero
Standings (after 6 of 13 competitions): (1) Staut 63 points (2) Meredith Michaels-Beerbaum  50 (3) Bengtsson 49
Central European League – North Sub-League:
7th competition in Poznań (CSI 2*-W):  Rein Pill  on Virgin Express  Jarosław Skrzyczyński  on Quintera  Vladimir Beleskiy  on Rockelman

Football (soccer)
 Argentine Primera División Apertura, final matchday:
Estudiantes (LP) 2–0 Arsenal
Racing 0–2 Vélez Sarsfield
Final standings: Estudiantes 45 points, Vélez Sársfield 43.
Estudiantes win the title for the fifth time.
 Campeonato Ecuatoriano de Fútbol Serie A Finals, second leg: (first leg score in parentheses)
Emelec 1–0 (0–2) LDU Quito. LDU Quito win 2–1 on aggregate.
LDU Quito win the championship for the tenth time.

Golf
European Tour:
Alfred Dunhill Championship in Mpumalanga, South Africa:
Winner: Pablo Martín  277 (−11)
Martín retains his title, winning his third European Tour title.

Handball
European Women's Championship in Denmark and Norway:
Group II in Lillehammer:
 21–23 
 25–26 
 24–19 
Standings (after 3 games): Sweden 6 points, Norway, Hungary 4, Netherlands, France 2, Ukraine 0.

Nine-ball pool
Mosconi Cup
Team Europe 11–8 Team USA
Mika Immonen  6–1 Rodney Morris 
Karl Boyes  5–6 Johnny Archer 
Nick van den Berg  5–6 Dennis Hatch 
Darren Appleton  6–2 Shane Van Boening 
Ralf Souquet  6–4 Corey Deuel 
Europe wins the Cup for the fifth time.

Rugby union
Heineken Cup pool stage, matchday 3:
Pool 2: Clermont  20–13  Leinster
Standings (after 3 matches): Leinster 10 points, Clermont 9,  Racing Métro 8,  Saracens 2
Pool 3:
Munster  22–16  Ospreys
London Irish  13–19  Toulon
Standings (after 3 matches): Munster 10 points, Toulon 8, Ospreys 6, London Irish 5
Pool 6: Newport Gwent Dragons  16–23  London Wasps
Standings (after 3 matches):  Toulouse 12 points, London Wasps 10,  Glasgow Warriors 4, Newport Gwent Dragons 1
Amlin Challenge Cup pool stage, matchday 3:
Pool 1:
Harlequins  20–9  Connacht
Bayonne  65–7  Cavalieri Prato
Standings (after 3 matches): Bayonne, Harlequins 10 points, Connacht 5, Cavalieri Prato 4
Pool 4: Leeds Carnegie  55–6  Overmach Parma
Standings (after 3 matches):  Stade Français 14 points, Leeds Carnegie 9,  București Oaks 4, Overmach Parma 1

Short track speed skating
World Cup 4 in Shanghai, China:
Men's:
500m:  Sung Si-Bak  42.246  Thibaut Fauconnet  42.327  Lee Ho-Suk  1:45.278
Standings (after 5 of 8 races): (1) Charles Hamelin  1722 points (2) Fauconnet 1635 (3) Han Jialiang  1590
1500m:  Noh Jinkyu  2:18.506  Yuzo Takamido  2:18.825  Olivier Jean  2:18.842
Standings (after 6 of 8 races): (1) Maxime Chataignier  1920 points (2) Jeff Simon  1850 (3) Kim Cheol-min  1774
5000m relay:   6:48.747   6:48.832   6:49.912
Standings (after 4 of 6 races): (1) Canada 3000 points (2)  2240 (3) Korea 1640
Women's:
500m:  Zhao Nannan  45.049  Liu Qiuhong  45.122  Jessica Gregg  45.218
Standings (after 5 of 8 races): (1) Zhao 3000 points (2) Fan Kexin  2080 (3) Liu 2010
1500m:  Cho Ha-Ri  2:32.554  Park Seung-Hi  2:32.607  Zhou Yang  2:32.801
Standings (after 6 of 8 races): (1) Katherine Reutter  2800 points (2) Zhou 2440 (3) Cho 1800
3000m relay:   4:16.645   4:16.795   4:20.487
Standings (after 4 of 6 races): (1) China 3000 points (2)  1952 (3)  1850

Ski jumping
World Cup in Harrachov, Czech Republic:
HS 142: Cancelled due to strong winds.

Snooker
UK Championship in Telford, England:
Final: John Higgins  [4] 10–9 Mark Williams  [5]
Higgins wins the title for the third time, and wins his 22nd ranking title.

Speed skating
World Cup 5 in Obihiro, Japan:
Men's:
500m:  Joji Kato  34.96  Keiichiro Nagashima  35.19(3)  Lee Kyu-Hyeok  35.19(8)
Standings (after 8 of 12 races): (1) Kato 615 points (2) Lee Kang-Seok  590 (3) Nagashima 488
1000m:  Samuel Schwarz  1:09.98  Shani Davis  1:10.15  Jan Bos  1:10.17
Standings (after 6 of 8 races): (1) Lee Kyu-Hyeok  402 points (2) Davis 380 (3) Stefan Groothuis  330
Women's:
500m:  Jenny Wolf  38.03  Lee Sang-hwa  38.21  Yu Jing  38.30
Standings (after 8 of 12 races): (1) Wolf 720 points (2) Lee 650 (3) Nao Kodaira  475
1000m:  Heather Richardson  1:17.27  Nao Kodaira  1:17.77  Maki Tsuji  1:18.29
Standings (after 6 of 8 races): (1) Richardson 490 points (2) Christine Nesbitt  400 (3) Kodaira 339

December 11, 2010 (Saturday)

Alpine skiing
Men's World Cup in Val-d'Isère, France:
Giant Slalom:  Ted Ligety  2:26.26  Aksel Lund Svindal  2:27.31  Massimiliano Blardone  2:27.47
Giant slalom standings (after 2 of 7 races): (1) Ligety 200 points (2) Svindal 125 (3) Kjetil Jansrud  106
Overall standings (after 6 of 38 races): (1) Svindal 236 points (2) Ligety 221 (3) Mario Scheiber  175
Women's World Cup in St. Moritz, Switzerland:
Super-G: Cancelled due to strong winds.

American football
NCAA Division I FBS:
Army–Navy Game in Philadelphia, Pennsylvania: Navy 31, Army 17
NCAA Division I FCS:
NCAA Division I Football Championship Quarterfinals (seeds in parentheses):
Villanova 42, (1) Appalachian State 24
Georgia Southern 23, Wofford 20
(5) Eastern Washington 38, North Dakota State 31 (OT)
SWAC Championship Game in Birmingham, Alabama: Texas Southern 11, Alabama State 6
Heisman Trophy: Cameron Newton, Quarterback, Auburn Tigers
Newton becomes the third Tiger to win the Trophy, after Pat Sullivan in 1971 and Bo Jackson in 1985.

Biathlon
World Cup 2 in Hochfilzen, Austria:
Men's 12.5 km Pursuit:  Tarjei Bø  36:32.4 (0+0+0+1)  Simon Eder  37:11.1 (0+0+0+0)  Ivan Tcherezov  37:12.4 (1+0+0+1)
Pursuit standings (after 2 of 7 races): (1) Bø 103 points (2) Ole Einar Bjørndalen  96 (3) Emil Hegle Svendsen  94
Overall standings (after 5 of 26 races): (1) Svendsen 257 points (2) Bø 246 (3) Bjørndalen 235
Women's 4 x 6 km Relay:   (Kathrin Hitzer/Magdalena Neuner/Sabrina Buchholz/Andrea Henkel) 1:16:22.5 (0+3+0+6)   (Oksana Khvostenko/Olena Pidhrushna/Vita Semerenko/Valj Semerenko) 1:17:21.6 (0+4+0+4)   (Synnøve Solemdal/Ann Kristin Flatland/Fynna Horn/Tora Berger) 1:17:30.9 (0+5+0+4)

Bobsleigh
World Cup in Park City, United States:
Four-man:  Alexandr Zubkov/Philipp Egorov/Dmitry Trunenkov/Nikolay Hrenkov  1:34.62 (47.35 / 47.27)  Manuel Machata/Andreas Bredau/Michail Makarow/Christian Poser  1:34.65 (47.52 / 47.13)  Lyndon Rush/Chris le Bihan/Cody Sorensen/Neville Wright  1:34.72 (47.46 / 47.26)
Standings (after 3 of 8 races): (1) Machata 635 points (2) Zubkov 601 (3) Maximilian Arndt  594

Cricket
ACC Trophy Challenge in Bangkok, Thailand:
3rd place play-off:   223 (48.4 overs);  107 (32 overs). Qatar win by 116 runs.
Final:   139 (43.3 overs) vs.   140/9 (41.4 overs). Maldives win by 1 wicket.

Cross-country skiing
World Cup in Davos, Switzerland:
Men's 15 km Classic:  Alexey Poltaranin  40:03.5  Alexander Legkov  40:04.4  Lukáš Bauer  40:07.5
Distance standings (after 4 of 17 races): (1) Legkov 198 points (2) Dario Cologna  194 (3) Marcus Hellner  165
Overall standings (after 7 of 31 races): (1) Legkov 398 points (2) Cologna 361 (3) Hellner 265
Women's 10 km Classic:  Marit Bjørgen  29:31.6   Justyna Kowalczyk  30:00.9  Therese Johaug  30:10.7
Distance standings (after 4 of 17 races): (1) Bjørgen 290 points (2) Kowalczyk 205 (3) Johaug 157
Overall standings (after 7 of 31 races): (1) Bjørgen 540 points (2) Kowalczyk 389 (3) Charlotte Kalla  311

Curling
European Championships in Champéry, Switzerland:
Men:
Bronze medal game: Germany  4–7  
Gold medal game:  Norway  5–3  
Norway win the title for the fourth time.
Women:
Bronze medal game:  Switzerland  9–5 
Gold medal game:  Scotland  6–8  
Sweden win the title for a record-extending 18th time.

Figure skating
ISU Grand Prix:
Grand Prix Final and Junior Grand Prix Final in Beijing, China:
Junior Men:  Richard Dornbush  219.56  Yan Han  186.05  Andrei Rogozine  181.78
Junior Pairs:  Narumi Takahashi / Mervin Tran  159.52  Ksenia Stolbova / Fedor Klimov  150.54  Yu Xiaoyu / Jin Yang  140.58
Senior Men:  Patrick Chan  259.75  Nobunari Oda  242.81  Takahiko Kozuka  237.79
Chan wins the title for the first time.
Senior Ladies:  Alissa Czisny  180.75  Carolina Kostner  178.60  Kanako Murakami  178.59
Czisny wins the title for the first time.
Senior Ice Dancing:  Meryl Davis / Charlie White  171.58  Nathalie Péchalat / Fabian Bourzat  162.10  Vanessa Crone / Paul Poirier  139.74
Davis/White win the title for the second straight time.
Senior Pairs:  Aliona Savchenko / Robin Szolkowy   210.72  Pang Qing / Tong Jian  189.93  Sui Wenjing / Han Cong  179.04
Savchenko/Szolkowy win the title for the second time.

Football (soccer)
FIFA Club World Cup in the United Arab Emirates:
Quarterfinals: Al-Wahda  1–4  Seongnam Ilhwa Chunma

Freestyle skiing
World Cup in Rukatunturi, Finland:
Men's Moguls:  Patrick Deneen  25.23 points  Mikaël Kingsbury  24.89  Guilbaut Colas  24.78
Women's Moguls:  Hannah Kearney  24.09 points  Jennifer Heil  24.02  Kristi Richards  23.52

Handball
European Women's Championship in Denmark and Norway: (teams in bold advance to the main round)
Group A in Aalborg:
 40–28 
 19–22 
Final standings: Denmark 6 points, Romania 4, Spain 2, Serbia 0.
Group B in Aarhus:
 30–21 
 28–29 
Final standings: Russia, Montenegro, Croatia 4 points, Iceland 0.

Ice hockey
NCAA: Michigan 5, Michigan State 0
In an event billed as The Big Chill at the Big House, a crowd of 113,411 packs Michigan Stadium, normally home to the Michigan football team, and sets a new attendance record for the sport.

Luge
World Cup in Calgary, Canada:
Men's singles:  Armin Zöggeler  1:29.651 (44.741 / 44.910)  Viktor Kneyb  1:29.912 (44.867 / 45.045)  Felix Loch  1:29.962 (44.952 / 45.010)
Standings (after 3 of 9 races): (1) Zöggeler 270 points (2) Loch & David Möller  230
Doubles:  Tobias Wendl/Tobias Arlt  1:28.099 (43.981 / 44.118)  Christian Oberstolz/Patrick Gruber  1:28.172 (44.002 / 44.170)  Hans Peter Fischnaller/Patrick Schwienbacher  1:28.394 (44.092 / 44.302)
Standings (after 3 of 9 races): (1) Wendl 260 points (2) Oberstolz 255 (3) Peter Penz  180

Mixed martial arts
UFC 124 in Montreal, Canada:
Welterweight Championship bout: Georges St-Pierre  (c) def. Josh Koscheck  by unanimous decision (50–45, 50–45, 50–45)
Heavyweight bout: Stefan Struve  def. Sean McCorkle  by TKO (punches)
Lightweight bout: Jim Miller  def. Charles Oliveira  by submission (kneebar)
Lightweight bout: Mac Danzig  def. Joe Stevenson  by knockout (punch)
Welterweight bout: Thiago Alves  def. John Howard  by unanimous decision (30–27, 30–27, 30–27)

Nine-ball pool
Mosconi Cup
Team Europe 8–6 Team USA
Mika Immonen  / Karl Boyes  5–1 Dennis Hatch  / Johnny Archer 
Mika Immonen  / Ralf Souquet  2–5 Johnny Archer  / Corey Deuel 
Karl Boyes  5–2 Rodney Morris 
Darren Appleton  / Nick van den Berg  4–5 Shane Van Boening  / Dennis Hatch 
Ralf Souquet  / Karl Boyes  5–4 Johnny Archer  / Rodney Morris 
Darren Appleton  5–4 Dennis Hatch 
Mika Immonen  / Nick van den Berg  5–1 Shane Van Boening  / Corey Deuel

Rugby union
IRB Sevens World Series:
South Africa Sevens in George, Western Cape:
Shield:  5–14 
Bowl:  26–0 
Plate:  10–5 
Cup:  19–22 
Standings (after 2 of 8 tournaments): (1) England 44 points (2) New Zealand 40 (3)  36
End of year tests:
Week 8:
 34–13  in Heidelberg
Heineken Cup pool stage, matchday 3:
Pool 1:
Castres  21–16  Edinburgh
Northampton Saints  23–15  Cardiff Blues
Standings (after 3 matches): Northampton 12 points, Castres 9, Cardiff Blues 5, Edinburgh 3
Pool 2: Saracens  21–24  Racing Métro
Standings:  Leinster 9 points (2 matches), Racing Métro 8 (3),  Clermont 5 (2), Saracens 2 (3)
Pool 4:
Ulster  22–18  Bath
Aironi  28–27  Biarritz
Standings (after 3 matches): Biarritz 11 points, Ulster 9, Bath 7, Aironi 4
Pool 5:
Perpignan  24–19  Leicester Tigers
Scarlets  35–27  Benetton Treviso
Standings (after 3 matches): Leicester Tigers 11 points, Perpignan, Scarlets 10, Benetton Treviso 1
Amlin Challenge Cup pool stage, matchday 3:
Pool 2:
Petrarca  37–10  El Salvador
Brive  18–9  Sale Sharks
Standings (after 3 matches): Brive 14 points, Sale Sharks 10, Petrarca 5, El Salvador 0
Pool 3: Exeter Chiefs  36–10  Newcastle Falcons
Standings (after 3 matches):  Montpellier 13 points, Exeter Chiefs 10, Newcastle Falcons 4,  Bourgoin 1
Pool 4: București Oaks  20–29  Stade Français
Standings: Stade Français 14 points (3 matches),  Leeds Carnegie 4 (2), București Oaks 4 (3),  Overmach Parma 1 (2)
Pool 5:
Rovigo  10–33  Agen
La Rochelle  6–13  Gloucester
Standings (after 3 matches): La Rochelle 11 points, Gloucester, Agen 10, Rovigo 0

Short track speed skating
World Cup 4 in Shanghai, China:
Men's:
1500m:  Kim Cheol-min  2:16.190  Song Weilong  2:16.191  Maxime Chataignier  2:16.315
Standings (after 5 of 8 races): (1) Chataignier 1920 points (2) Jeff Simon  1850 (3) Guillaume Bastille  1747
1000m:  Noh Jinkyu  1:30.345  Sjinkie Knegt  1:30.402  Lee Ho-Suk  2:10.168
Standings (after 5 of 8 races): (1) Thibaut Fauconnet  2800 points (2) Travis Jayner  1702 (3) Anthony Lobello, Jr.  1664
Women's:
1500m:  Yang Shin-young  2:28.216  Hwang Hyun-sun  2:28.449  Kim Dam-min  2:28.534
Standings (after 5 of 8 races): (1) Katherine Reutter  2800 points (2) Zhou Yang  2440 (3) Biba Sakurai  1490
1000m:  Cho Ha-Ri  1:32.655  Zhou Yang  1:32.916  Liu Qiuhong  1:33.595
Standings (after 5 of 8 races): (1) Zhou 2440 points (2) Katherine Reutter  1968 (3) Liu 1690

Ski jumping
World Cup in Harrachov, Czech Republic:
HS 142: Cancelled due to strong winds.

Snooker
UK Championship in Telford, England:
Semi-final: Mark Williams  [5] 9–8 Shaun Murphy  [8]

Snowboarding
World Cup in Limone Piemonte, Italy:
Parallel Slalom men:  Roland Fischnaller   Aaron March   Roland Haldi 
Parallel Slalom standings (after 3 of 12 races): (1) Fischnaller & Andreas Prommegger  2090 points (3) March 1580
Overall standings: (1) Fischnaller & Prommegger 2090 points (3) March 1580
Parallel Slalom women:  Patrizia Kummer   Fränzi Mägert-Kohli   Yekaterina Ilyukhina 
Parallel Slalom standings (after 3 of 12 races): (1) Yekaterina Tudegesheva  2290 points (2) Alena Zavarzina  1850 (3) Mägert-Kohli 1750
Overall standings: (1) Tudegesheva 2290 points (2) Dominique Maltais  2000 (3) Zavarzina 1850

Speed skating
World Cup 5 in Obihiro, Japan:
Men's:
500m:  Lee Kang-Seok  35.11  Keiichiro Nagashima  35.16(3)  Akio Ota  35.16(8)
Standings (after 7 of 12 races): (1) Lee 550 points (2) Joji Kato  515 (3) Nagashima 408
1000m:  Shani Davis  1:09.56  Lee Kyu-Hyeok  1:09.80  Denny Morrison  1:10.39
Standings (after 5 of 8 races): (1) Lee 342 points (2) Stefan Groothuis  330 (3) Davis 300
Women's:
500m:  Lee Sang-hwa  38.18  Yu Jing  38.21  Jenny Wolf  38.25
Standings (after 7 of 12 races): (1) Wolf 620 points (2) Lee 570 (3) Nao Kodaira  415
1000m:  Heather Richardson  1:16.45  Nao Kodaira  1:17.33  Lee Sang-hwa  1:17.87
Standings (after 5 of 8 races): (1) Christine Nesbitt  400 points (2) Richardson 390 (3) Margot Boer  260

December 10, 2010 (Friday)

American football
NCAA Division I Football Championship Quarterfinal (seed in parentheses):
(3) Delaware 16, New Hampshire 3

Basketball
NBA: Denver Nuggets 123, Toronto Raptors 116
In his 1,679th match as a head coach, George Karl becomes the seventh coach to record 1,000 regular season wins.

Biathlon
World Cup 2 in Hochfilzen, Austria:
Men's 10 km Sprint:  Tarjei Bø  28:17.6 (0+0)  Serguei Sednev  28:45.1 (0+1)  Alexis Bœuf  28:50.9 (0+1)
Sprint standings (after 2 of 10 races): (1) Emil Hegle Svendsen  103 points (2) Bø 100 (3) Ole Einar Bjørndalen  85
Overall standings (after 4 of 26 races): (1) Svendsen 217 points (2) Bjørndalen 199 (3) Bø 186
Women's 7.5 km Sprint:  Anastasiya Kuzmina  25:30.6 (0+0)  Darya Domracheva  25:50.4 (0+1)  Kaisa Mäkäräinen  25:54.4 (0+1)
Sprint standings (after 2 of 10 races): (1) Mäkäräinen 108 points (2) Domracheva 102 (3) Helena Ekholm  80
Overall standings (after 4 of 26 races): (1) Mäkäräinen 198 points (2) Ekholm 176 (3) Anna Carin Zidek  164

Bobsleigh
World Cup in Park City, United States:
Two-man:  Alexandr Zubkov/Dmitry Trunenkov  1:37.33 (48.95 / 48.38)  Simone Bertazzo/Sergio Riva  1:37.47 (49.15 / 48.32)  Manuel Machata/Andreas Bredau  1:37.67 (49.30 / 48.37)
Standings (after 3 of 8 races): (1) Machata 635 points (2) Zubkov 593 (3) Lyndon Rush  & Patrice Servelle  546
Women: Cancelled due to snowstorms.

Cricket
New Zealand in India:
5th ODI in Chennai:  103 (27 overs);  107/2 (21.1 overs). India win by 8 wickets; win 5-match series 5–0.
Zimbabwe in Bangladesh:
4th ODI in Chittagong:  vs. . Match abandoned without a ball bowled; Bangladesh lead 5-match series 2–1.

Curling
European Championships in Champéry, Switzerland:
Men Semifinal: Switzerland  7–9 
Women Semifinal: Russia  5–7

Figure skating
ISU Grand Prix:
Grand Prix Final and Junior Grand Prix Final in Beijing, China:
Junior Ice dancing:  Ksenia Monko / Kirill Khaliavin  136.22  Victoria Sinitsina / Ruslan Zhiganshin  134.62  Alexandra Stepanova / Ivan Bukin  129.94
Junior Ladies:  Adelina Sotnikova  169.81  Elizaveta Tuktamysheva  160.87  Li Zijun  149.82
Senior Ice Dance – Short Dance: (1) Meryl Davis / Charlie White  68.64 (2) Nathalie Péchalat / Fabian Bourzat  65.66 (3) Nóra Hoffmann / Maxim Zavozin  55.98
Senior Men – Short Program: (1) Nobunari Oda  86.59 (2) Patrick Chan  85.59 (3) Daisuke Takahashi  82.57
Senior Ladies – Short Program: (1) Alissa Czisny  63.76 (2) Carolina Kostner  62.13 (3) Kanako Murakami  61.47
Senior Pairs – Short Program: (1) Aliona Savchenko / Robin Szolkowy  74.40 (2) Pang Qing / Tong Jian  68.63 (3) Vera Bazarova / Yuri Larionov  63.86

Football (soccer)
FIFA Club World Cup in the United Arab Emirates:
Quarterfinals: TP Mazembe  1–0  Pachuca

Handball
European Women's Championship in Denmark and Norway: (teams in bold advance to the main round)
Group C in Larvik:
 25–18 
 23–33 
Final standings: Sweden 6 points, Netherlands, Ukraine, Germany 2.
Group D in Lillehammer:
 29–19 
 34–13 
Final standings: Norway 6 points, Hungary 4, France 2, Slovenia 0.

Luge
World Cup in Calgary, Canada:
Women' singles:  Tatjana Hüfner  1:33.658 (46.814 / 46.844)  Anke Wischnewski  1:33.801 (46.912 / 46.889)  Erin Hamlin  1:33.955 (46.969 / 46.986)
Standings (after 3 of 9 races): (1) Hüfner 300 points (2) Natalie Geisenberger  230 (3) Wischnewski 205

Nine-ball pool
Mosconi Cup
Team Europe 3–4 Team USA
Darren Appleton  / Karl Boyes  6–3 Shane Van Boening  / Johnny Archer 
Ralf Souquet  5–6 Johnny Archer 
Ralf Souquet  / Darren Appleton  6–5 Rodney Morris  / Corey Deuel 
Nick van den Berg  5–6 Shane Van Boening

Rugby union
Heineken Cup pool stage, matchday 3:
Pool 6: Glasgow Warriors  16–28  Toulouse
Standings: Toulouse 12 points (3 matches),  London Wasps 6 (2), Glasgow Warriors 4 (3),  Newport Gwent Dragons 0 (2).

Snooker
UK Championship in Telford, England:
Semi-final: Mark Allen  [12] 5–9 John Higgins  [4]

Snowboarding
World Cup in Limone Piemonte, Italy:
Parallel Giant Slalom men:  Benjamin Karl   Andreas Prommegger   Manuel Veith 
Parallel Slalom standings (after 2 of 12 races): (1) Prommegger 1800 points (2) Karl 1260 (3) Roland Fischnaller  1090
Overall standings: (1) Prommegger 1800 points (2) Karl 1260 (3) Sébastien Toutant  1220
Parallel Giant Slalom women:  Yekaterina Tudegesheva   Alena Zavarzina   Svetlana Boldykova 
Parallel Slalom standings (after 2 of 12 races): (1) Tudegesheva 2000 points (2) Zavarzina 1400 (3) Fränzi Mägert-Kohli  & Heidi Neururer  950
Overall standings: (1) Dominique Maltais  & Tudegesheva 2000 points (3) Maëlle Ricker  1600

U.S. college sports
Conference realignment: The University of Hawaii announces that it will leave the Western Athletic Conference in July 2012. The Hawaii football program will join the Mountain West Conference, while the school's other teams will join the Big West Conference.

December 9, 2010 (Thursday)

American football
NFL Thursday Night Football, Week 14: Indianapolis Colts 30, Tennessee Titans 28

Basketball
Euroleague Regular Season, matchday 8: (teams in bold advance to the Top 16)
Group A:
Maccabi Tel Aviv  76–62  Partizan Belgrade
Asseco Prokom Gdynia  69–72  Žalgiris Kaunas
Caja Laboral  89–81  Khimki Moscow
Standings (after 8 games): Maccabi Tel Aviv 7–1; Žalgiris Kaunas 5–3; Partizan Belgrade 4–4; Caja Laboral, Khimki Moscow 3–5; Asseco Prokom Gdynia 2–6.
Group B:
Unicaja Málaga  76–74  Olympiacos Piraeus
Real Madrid  72–50  Virtus Roma
Standings (after 8 games): Olympiacos Piraeus, Real Madrid, Unicaja Málaga 5–3; Virtus Roma 4–4;  Spirou Basket 3–5;  Brose Baskets 2–6.
Group C:
Lietuvos Rytas  92–80  Cholet Basket
Fenerbahçe Ülker  69–75  Regal FC Barcelona
Standings (after 8 games):  Montepaschi Siena 7–1; Fenerbahçe Ülker, Regal FC Barcelona 6–2; Cholet Basket 3–5; Lietuvos Rytas 2–6;  KK Cibona Zagreb 0–8.
Group D: Panathinaikos Athens  95–88  Union Olimpija Ljubljana (OT)
Standings (after 8 games): Panathinaikos Athens 6–2; Union Olimpija Ljubljana 5–3;  Armani Jeans Milano,  Efes Pilsen Istanbul 4–4;  Power Electronics Valencia 3–5;  CSKA Moscow 2–6.

Curling
European Championships in Champéry, Switzerland:
Men: (teams in bold advance to the play-off; teams in italics qualify for the 2011 World Championship)
Draw 9:
Netherlands  5–8 
Scotland  7–5 
Czech Republic  8–3 
Denmark  12–5 
Russia  7–8 
Final standings: Switzerland, Norway, Germany 7–2, Denmark 6–3, Scotland, Sweden 5–4, Czech Republic, France 3–6, Russia, Netherlands 1–8.
Playoffs:
1 vs. 2: Switzerland  4–5 
3 vs. 4: Germany  5–10 
Tie-breaker game: France  3–8 
Women Playoffs:
1 vs. 2: Scotland  9–4 
3 vs. 4: Sweden  3–5

Figure skating
ISU Grand Prix:
Grand Prix Final and Junior Grand Prix Final in Beijing, China:
Junior Ice dance – Short Dance: (1) Victoria Sinitsina / Ruslan Zhiganshin  55.58 (2) Ksenia Monko / Kirill Khaliavin  55.50 (3) Alexandra Stepanova / Ivan Bukin  53.59
Junior Ladies – Short Program: (1) Adelina Sotnikova  57.27 (2) Elizaveta Tuktamysheva  53.76 (3) Polina Shelepen  53.26
Junior Men – Short Program: (1) Richard Dornbush  70.75 (2) Keegan Messing  68.52 (3) Yan Han  67.29
Junior Pairs – Short Program: (1) Narumi Takahashi / Mervin Tran  53.94 (2) Ksenia Stolbova / Fedor Klimov  49.63 (3) Taylor Steele / Robert Schultz  48.07

Handball
European Women's Championship in Denmark and Norway: (teams in bold advance to the main round)
Group A in Aalborg:
 23–26 
 22–25 
Standings (after 2 games): Denmark 4 points, Romania, Spain 2, Serbia 0.
Group B in Aarhus:
 23–26 
 30–24 
Standings (after 2 games): Montenegro 4 points, Croatia, Russia 2, Iceland 0.

Nine-ball pool
Mosconi Cup
Team Europe 1–2 Team USA
Team Europe 6–5 Team USA  
Nick van den Berg  / Ralf Souquet  4–6 Dennis Hatch  / Rodney Morris 
Mika Immonen  4–6 Corey Deuel

Rugby union
Amlin Challenge Cup pool stage, matchday 3:
Pool 3: Montpellier  39–14  Bourgoin
Standings: Montpellier 13 points (3 matches),  Exeter Chiefs 5 (2),  Newcastle Falcons 4 (2), Bourgoin 1 (3).
The Varsity Match in London: Oxford 21–10 Cambridge

Skeleton
World Cup in Park City, United States:
Men:  Aleksandr Tretyakov  1:38.48 (49.37 / 49.11)  Sandro Stielicke  1:38.49 (49.17 / 49.32)  Martins Dukurs  1:38.50 (49.24 / 49.26)
Standings (after 3 of 8 events): (1) Tretyakov 635 points (2) Dukurs 609 (3) Kristan Bromley  602
Women:  Anja Huber  1:40.62 (50.58 / 50.04)  Shelley Rudman  1:40.80 (50.47 / 50.33)  Amy Gough  1:41.02 (50.68 / 50.34)
Standings (after 3 of 8 events): (1) Huber 650 points (2) Rudman 604 (3) Mellisa Hollingsworth  594

Snooker
UK Championship in Telford, England, Quarter-finals:
Mark Joyce  7–9 Mark Williams  [5]
Shaun Murphy  [8] 9–7 Neil Robertson  [2]

December 8, 2010 (Wednesday)

Basketball
Euroleague Regular Season, matchday 8: (teams in bold advance to the Top 16; teams eliminated from Top 16 contention in strike)
Group B: Spirou Basket  75–61  Brose Baskets
Standings:  Olympiacos Piraeus 5–2,  Real Madrid,  Unicaja Málaga,  Virtus Roma 4–3, Spirou Basket 3–5, Brose Baskets 2–6.
Group C: KK Cibona Zagreb  66–82  Montepaschi Siena
Standings: Montepaschi Siena 7–1,  Fenerbahçe Ülker 6–1,  Regal FC Barcelona 5–2,  Cholet Basket 3–4,  Lietuvos Rytas 1–6, KK Cibona Zagreb 0–8.
Group D:
CSKA Moscow  73–63  Power Electronics Valencia
Armani Jeans Milano  84–70  Efes Pilsen Istanbul
Standings:  Panathinaikos Athens,  Union Olimpija Ljubljana 5–2, Armani Jeans Milano, Efes Pilsen Istanbul 4–4, Power Electronics Valencia 3–5, CSKA Moscow 2–6.

Curling
European Championships in Champéry, Switzerland:
Men draw 8: (teams in bold advance to the play-off; teams in italics qualify for the 2011 World Championship)
France  5–4 
Netherlands  2–8 
Switzerland  6–4 
Russia  4–5 
Denmark  4–7 
Standings (after 8 games): Switzerland 7–1, Germany, Norway 6–2, Denmark, Sweden 5–3, Scotland 4–4, France 3–5, Czech Republic 2–6, Netherlands, Russia 1–7.
Women draw 8:
Latvia  5–7 
Russia  1–9 
Sweden  10–6 
Netherlands  5–8 
Switzerland  8–5 
Women draw 9: (teams in bold advance to the play-off; teams in italics qualify for the 2011 World Championship)
Russia  7–5 
Germany  8–7 
Denmark  4–3 
Switzerland  8–6 
Netherlands  3–8 
Final standings: Scotland 8–1, Russia, Switzerland 7–2, Sweden 6–3, Denmark, Norway 5–4, Germany 4–5, Latvia 2–7, Finland 1–8, Netherlands 0–9.

Football (soccer)
AFF Suzuki Cup: (teams in bold advance to the semifinals)
Group B in Vietnam:
 0–0 
 1–0 
Final standings: Vietnam 6 points, Philippines 5, Singapore 4, Myanmar 1.
FIFA Club World Cup in the United Arab Emirates:
Play-off for Quarterfinals: Al-Wahda  3–0  Hekari United
UEFA Champions League group stage, matchday 6: (teams in bold advance to the Round of 16, teams in italics advance to the Europa League Round of 32)
Group E:
Bayern Munich  3–0  Basel
CFR Cluj  1–1  Roma
Final standings: Bayern Munich 15 points, Roma 10, Basel 6, CFR Cluj 4.
Group F:
Marseille  1–0  Chelsea
Žilina  1–2  Spartak Moscow
Final standings: Chelsea 15 points, Marseille 12, Spartak Moscow 9, Žilina 0.
Group G:
Real Madrid  4–0  Auxerre
Milan  0–2  Ajax
Final standings: Real Madrid 16 points, Milan 8, Ajax 7, Auxerre 3.
Group H:
Arsenal  3–1  Partizan
Shakhtar Donetsk  2–0  Braga
Final standings: Shakhtar Donetsk 15 points, Arsenal 12, Braga 9, Partizan 0.
Copa Sudamericana Finals, second leg: (first leg score in parentheses)
Independiente  3–1 (0–2)  Goiás. 3–3 on points, 3–3 on aggregate; Independiente win 5–3 on penalties.
Independiente win the Cup for the first time.

Handball
European Women's Championship in Denmark and Norway: (teams in bold advance to the main round)
Group C in Larvik:
 33–25 
 27–30 
Standings (after 2 games): Sweden 4 points, Netherlands, Germany 2, Ukraine 0.
Group D in Lillehammer:
 18–21 
 16–32 
Standings (after 2 games): Hungary, Norway 4 points, Slovenia, France 0.

Snooker
UK Championship in Telford, England, Quarter-finals:
Mark Allen  [12] 9–7 Stuart Bingham 
Stephen Maguire  [6] 7–9 John Higgins  [4]

Snowboarding
World Cup in Lech am Arlberg, Austria:
Snowboard Cross men:  Luca Matteotti   Alex Pullin   Paul-Henri de Le Rue 
Snowboard Cross standings (after 2 of 7 races): (1) Nate Holland  1200 points (2) Matteotti 1160 (3) Mario Fuchs  1100
Overall standings: (1) Holland 1200 points (2) Matteotti 1160 (3) Fuchs 1100
Snowboard Cross women:  Dominique Maltais   Maëlle Ricker   Aleksandra Zhekova 
Snowboard Cross standings (after 2 of 7 races): (1) Maltais 2000 points (2) Ricker 1600 (3) Zhekova 1000
Overall standings: (1) Maltais 2000 points (2) Ricker 1600 (3) Yekaterina Tudegesheva  & Zhekova 1000

December 7, 2010 (Tuesday)

Cricket
England in Australia:
Ashes series:
Second Test in Adelaide, day 5:  245 & 304 (99.1 overs; Graeme Swann 5/91);  620/5d. England win by an innings and 71 runs; lead 5-match series 1–0.
New Zealand in India:
4th ODI in Bangalore:  315/7 (50 overs);  321/5 (48.5 overs; Yusuf Pathan 123*). India win by 5 wickets; lead 5-match series 4–0.

Curling
European Championships in Champéry, Switzerland:
Men draw 6:
Russia  2–5 
Czech Republic  3–8 
Sweden  4–6 
Netherlands  2–6 
France  2–8 
Men draw 7:
Norway  7–9 
France  7–5 
Denmark  2–5 
Germany  7–6 
Czech Republic  7–1 
Standings (after 7 games): Germany, Switzerland 6–1, Denmark, Norway 5–2, Scotland, Sweden 4–3, France 2–5, Czech Republic, Netherlands, Russia 1–6.
Women draw 7:
Scotland  7–5 
Latvia  8–5 
Switzerland  7–4 
Norway  9–3 
Denmark  1–7 
Standings (after 7 games): Russia, Scotland 6–1, Norway, Sweden, Switzerland 5–2, Denmark 3–4, Germany, Latvia 2–5, Finland 1–6, Netherlands 0–7.

Football (soccer)
AFF Suzuki Cup:
Group A in Indonesia: (teams in bold advance to the semifinals)
 2–1 
 5–1 
Final standings: Indonesia 9 points, Malaysia 4, Thailand 2, Laos 1.
UEFA Champions League group stage, matchday 6: (teams in bold advance to the Round of 16, teams in italics advance to the Europa League Round of 32)
Group A:
Twente  3–3  Tottenham Hotspur
Werder Bremen  3–0  Internazionale
Final standings: Tottenham Hotspur 11 points, Internazionale 10, Twente 6, Werder Bremen 5.
Group B:
Lyon  2–2  Hapoel Tel Aviv
Benfica  1–2  Schalke 04
Final standings: Schalke 04 13 points, Lyon 10, Benfica 6, Hapoel Tel Aviv 5.
Group C:
Manchester United  1–1  Valencia
Bursaspor  1–1  Rangers
Final standings: Manchester United 14 points, Valencia 11, Rangers 6, Bursaspor 1.
Group D:
Barcelona  2–0  Rubin Kazan
Copenhagen  3–1  Panathinaikos
Final standings: Barcelona 14 points, Copenhagen 10, Rubin Kazan 6, Panathinaikos 2.
Copenhagen becomes the first Danish team that advances to the knock-out stage of the Champions League.

Handball
European Women's Championship in Denmark and Norway:
Group A in Aalborg:
 26–30 
 25–20 
Group B in Aarhus:
 24–22 
 35–25 
Group C in Larvik:
 25–27 
 13–25 
Group D in Lillehammer:
 28–19 
 33–22

Snooker
UK Championship in Telford, England, Last 16:
Ding Junhui  [1] 8–9 Mark Allen  [12]
Stephen Maguire  [6] 9–7 Mark Selby  [9]
Graeme Dott  [11] 8–9 John Higgins  [4]
Andrew Higginson  5–9 Neil Robertson  [2]
Marco Fu  [16] 2–9 Stuart Bingham 
Mark Joyce  9–7 Judd Trump 
Stephen Hendry  [10] 6–9 Mark Williams  [5]
Shaun Murphy  [8] 9–8 Ryan Day

Snowboarding
World Cup in Lech am Arlberg, Austria:
Snowboard Cross men:  Nate Holland   Tom Velisek   Mario Fuchs 
Overall standings: (1) Holland & Andreas Prommegger  1000 points (3) Roland Fischnaller  & Velisek 800
Snowboard Cross women:  Dominique Maltais   Maëlle Ricker   Yuka Fujimori 
Overall standings: (1) Maltais & Yekaterina Tudegesheva  1000 points (3) Heidi Neururer  & Ricker 800

December 6, 2010 (Monday)

American football
NFL Monday Night Football, Week 13: New England Patriots 45, New York Jets 3
The Denver Broncos fire head coach Josh McDaniels and name running backs coach Eric Studesville as interim replacement.

Baseball
Baseball Hall of Fame balloting:
In the first vote of a newly revamped Veterans Committee, which this year only considered individuals whose chief contributions occurred after 1972, Pat Gillick, former general manager of the Toronto Blue Jays, Baltimore Orioles, Seattle Mariners, and most recently the Philadelphia Phillies, is the only candidate elected. Gillick will formally enter the Hall in July 2011.

Cricket
England in Australia:
Ashes series:
Second Test in Adelaide, day 4:  245 & 238/4 (79.2 overs);  620/5d (152 overs; Kevin Pietersen 227). Australia trail by 137 runs with 6 wickets remaining.
Zimbabwe in Bangladesh:
3rd ODI in Mirpur:  246/7 (50 overs);  181 (48.1 overs). Bangladesh win by 65 runs, lead the 5-match series 2–1.

Curling
European Championships in Champéry, Switzerland:
Men draw 4:
Germany  3–7 
Sweden  6–1 
Scotland  7–4 
Switzerland  8–7 
Netherlands  2–8 
Men draw 5:
Czech Republic  6–9 
Denmark  2–8 
Netherlands  5–7 
Norway  6–2 
Switzerland  8–6 
Standings (after 5 games): Denmark, Germany, Norway, Sweden, Switzerland 4–1, Scotland 2–3, France, Netherlands, Russia 1–4, Czech Republic 0–5.
Women draw 5:
Denmark  8–6 
Switzerland  8–2 
Russia  9–3 
Scotland  10–2 
Sweden  6–1 
Women draw 6:
Netherlands  2–10 
Denmark  6–5 
Finland  6–9 
Russia  7–5 
Latvia  1–10 
Standings (after 6 games): Russia, Scotland, Sweden 5–1, Norway, Switzerland 4–2, Denmark, Germany 3–3, Finland, Latvia 1–5, Netherlands 0–6.

Snooker
UK Championship in Telford, England, Last 32:
Marco Fu  [16]  9–7 Barry Hawkins 
Ali Carter  [3] 6–9 Mark Joyce 
Stephen Hendry  [10] 9–8 Jimmy White 
Mark Williams  [5] 9–3 Mark Davis 
Ronnie O'Sullivan  [7] 6–9 Stuart Bingham 
Jamie Cope  [14] 6–9 Judd Trump 
Shaun Murphy  [8] 9–5 Patrick Wallace 
Mark King  [15] 8–9 Ryan Day

December 5, 2010 (Sunday)

Alpine skiing
Men's World Cup in Beaver Creek, United States:
Giant Slalom:  Ted Ligety  2:37.67  Kjetil Jansrud  2:38.49  Marcel Hirscher  2:38.91
Overall standings (after 5 of 38 races): (1) Mario Scheiber  175 points (2) Didier Cuche  158 (3) Aksel Lund Svindal  156
Women's World Cup in Lake Louise, Canada:
Super-G:  Lindsey Vonn  1:20.72  Maria Riesch  1:21.55  Julia Mancuso  1:21.61
Overall standings (after 7 of 38 races): (1) Riesch 514 points (2) Vonn 345 (3) Viktoria Rebensburg  224

American football
NFL Week 13:
New York Giants 31, Washington Redskins 7
Kansas City Chiefs 10, Denver Broncos 6
Jacksonville Jaguars 17, Tennessee Titans 6
Green Bay Packers 34, San Francisco 49ers 16
Cleveland Browns 13, Miami Dolphins 10
Minnesota Vikings 38, Buffalo Bills 14
Chicago Bears 24, Detroit Lions 20
New Orleans Saints 34, Cincinnati Bengals 30
Oakland Raiders 28, San Diego Chargers 13
Seattle Seahawks 31, Carolina Panthers 14
Atlanta Falcons 28, Tampa Bay Buccaneers 24
St. Louis Rams 19, Arizona Cardinals 6
Dallas Cowboys 38, Indianapolis Colts 35 (OT)
Sunday Night Football: Pittsburgh Steelers 13, Baltimore Ravens 10

Auto racing
V8 Supercars:
Sydney Telstra 500, Race 26 in Sydney, New South Wales: (1) Lee Holdsworth  (Holden Commodore) (2) Steven Richards  (Ford Falcon) (3) Shane van Gisbergen  (Ford Falcon)
Final drivers' championship standings: (1) James Courtney  (Ford Falcon) 3055 points (2) Jamie Whincup  (Holden Commodore) 2990 (3) Mark Winterbottom  (Ford Falcon) 2729
Courtney wins his first championship title.

Badminton
BWF Super Series:
China Open Super Series in Shanghai:
Men's singles: Chen Long  def. Bao Chunlai  9–21, 21–14, 21–16
Women's singles: Jiang Yanjiao  def. Wang Shixian  21–16, 21–19
Men's doubles: Jung Jae-sung  / Lee Yong-dae  def. Chai Biao  / Zhang Nan  21–15, 21–12
Women's doubles: Cheng Shu  / Zhao Yunlei  def. Ma Jin  / Zhong Qianxin  walkover
Mixed doubles: Tao Jiaming  / Tian Qing  def. Zhang Nan  / Zhao Yunlei  21–18, 21–17

Biathlon
World Cup 1 in Östersund, Sweden:
Women's 10 km Pursuit:  Kaisa Mäkäräinen  31:57.1 (0+0+0+0)  Miriam Gössner  33:22.4 (0+1+1+1)  Helena Ekholm  33:38.6 (0+1+0+1)
Overall standings (after 3 of 26 races): (1) Mäkäräinen 150 points (2) Ekholm 136 (3) Anna Carin Zidek  135
Men's 12.5 km Pursuit:  Ole Einar Bjørndalen  35:47.7 (0+0+1+1)  Emil Hegle Svendsen  36:13.9 (0+0+1+2)  Jakov Fak  36:48.4 (1+2+0+0)
Overall standings (after 3 of 26 races): (1) Svendsen 174 points (2) Bjørndalen 168 (3) Martin Fourcade  136

Cricket
England in Australia:
Ashes series:
Second Test in Adelaide, day 3:  245;  551/4 (143 overs; Kevin Pietersen 213*, Alastair Cook 148). England lead by 306 runs with 6 wickets remaining in the 1st innings.
West Indies in Sri Lanka:
3rd Test in Kandy, day 5:  303/8 (103.3 overs); . Match drawn; 3-match series drawn 0–0.
ICC Intercontinental Shield Final in Dubai, United Arab Emirates, day 4:
 79 & 427 (173.1 overs; Saqib Ali 160*, Sarel Burger 5/80);  320 & 187/4 (39.4 overs; Craig Williams 113*). Namibia win by 6 wickets.

Cross-country skiing
World Cup in Düsseldorf, Germany:
Men's Team Sprint Freestyle:   II (Ola Vigen Hattestad, Anders Gløersen) 19:56.6   I (Mats Larsson, Emil Jönsson) 19:56.8   II (Fabio Pasini, David Hofer) 19:57.6
Women's Team Sprint Freestyle:   I (Magda Genuin, Arianna Follis) 10:41.1   I (Maiken Caspersen Falla, Celine Brun-Lie) 10:42.0   (Daria Gaiazova, Chandra Crawford) 10:43.5

Curling
European Championships in Champéry, Switzerland:
Men draw 3:
Scotland  8–6 
Germany  7–5 
Norway  5–6 
France  3–4 
Sweden  6–7 
Standings (after 3 games): Denmark, Germany 3–0, Norway, Sweden, Switzerland 2–1, France, Netherlands, Scotland 1–2, Czech Republic, Russia 0–3.
Women draw 3:
Germany  11–8 
Norway  3–6 
Scotland  6–5 
Latvia  2–9 
Finland  7–8 
Women draw 4:
Switzerland  8–4 
Sweden  9–7 
Netherlands  3–6 
Germany  3–4 
Scotland  6–4 
Standings (after 4 games): Sweden 4–0, Norway, Russia, Scotland 3–1, Germany, Switzerland 2–2, Denmark, Finland, Latvia 1–3, Netherlands 0–4.

Equestrianism
Four-in-hand driving:
FEI World Cup:
4th competition in Budapest (CAI-W):  Werner Ulrich   Boyd Exell   Daniel Würgler 
Show jumping:
FEI World Cup Central European League – South Sub-League:
6th competition in Budapest (CSI 2*-W):  Jerry Smit  on Luis della Caccia  Francesca Arioldi  on Agadir  Make Stroman  on Flashlight
CSI 5* Paris-Villepinte – Grand Prix:  Marco Kutscher  on Cash  Christian Ahlmann  on Taloubet Z  Simon Delestre  on Napoli du Ry

Football (soccer)
AFF Suzuki Cup:
Group B in Hanoi, Vietnam:
 2–1 
 2–0 
Standings (after 2 matches): Philippines, Singapore 4 points, Vietnam 3, Myanmar 0.
Caribbean Championship Final Tournament in Fort-de-France, Martinique:
Third Place Playoff:  0–1  
Final:   1–1 (4–5 pen.)  
Jamaica win the title for the second straight time and fifth overall.
Arabian Gulf Cup Final in Aden, Yemen:
 1–0 (a.e.t.) 
Kuwait win the Cup for the tenth time after a 12 years break.
 Campeonato Brasileiro Série A, final matchday: (teams in bold qualify for Copa Libertadores)
Fluminense 1–0 Guarani
Goiás 1–1 Corinthians
Cruzeiro 2–1 Palmeiras
Grêmio 3–0 Botafogo
Final standings: Fluminense 71 points, Cruzeiro 69, Corinthians 68, Grêmio 63.
Fluminense win the Championship for the second time after a break of 26 years.
 Chilean Primera División, final matchday: (teams in bold qualify for Copa Libertadores)
Universidad Católica 5–0 Everton
Colo-Colo 4–2 Universidad de Concepción
Final standings: Universidad Católica 74 points, Colo-Colo 71.
Universidad Católica win the Championship for the tenth time.
 Campeonato Ecuatoriano de Fútbol Serie A Finals, first leg:
LDU Quito 2–0 Emelec
 Primera División de México Apertura Liguilla Final, second leg: (first leg score in parentheses)
Monterrey 3–0 (2–3) Santos Laguna. Monterrey win 5–3 on aggregate.
Monterrey win the title for the fourth time.

Golf
LPGA Tour:
LPGA Tour Championship in Orlando, Florida:
Winner: Maria Hjorth  283 (−5)
Hjorth wins her fourth LPGA Tour title, and first since 2007.

Luge
World Cup in Winterberg, Germany:
Women' singles:  Tatjana Hüfner  1:54.669 (57.654 / 57.015)  Natalie Geisenberger  1:55.283 (57.854 / 57.429)  Alex Gough  1:55.411 (57.859 / 57.552)
Standings (after 2 of 9 races): (1) Hüfner 200 points (2) Geisenberger 170 (3) Anke Wischnewski  120
Team relay:   2:26.594 (47.291 / 49.561 / 49.561)   2:27.037 (47.729 / 49.722 / 49.586)   2:27.152 (47.877 / 49.633 / 49.642)
Standings (after 2 of 6 races): (1) Germany 200 points (2) Italy 155 (3)  135

Nordic combined
World Cup in Trondheim, Norway:
HS 138 / 10 km:  Jason Lamy-Chappuis   24:35.5  Mikko Kokslien  24:45.2  Mario Stecher  24:45.3
Overall standings (after 4 of 12 races): (1) Lamy-Chappuis 340 points (2) Kokslien 289 (3) Felix Gottwald  260

Short track speed skating
World Cup 3 in Changchun, China:
Men's:
500 m:  Semen Elistratov  43.300  Remi Beaulieu  43.410  Ryosuke Sakazume  43.596
Standings (after 4 of 8 races): (1) François-Louis Tremblay  1512 points (2) Liang Wenhao  1475 (3) Han Jialiang  1328
1000 m:  Kim Byeong-jun  1:25.474  Thibaut Fauconnet  1:26.208  Maxime Chataignier  1:26.485
Standings (after 4 of 8 races): (1) Fauconnet 2800 points (2) Travis Jayner  1702 (3) Anthony Lobello, Jr.  1664
5000 m relay:   6:54.065   6:54.180   7:00.949
Standings (after 3 of 6 races): (1) Canada 3000 points (2) United States 2240 (3)  1234
Women's:
500 m:  Zhao Nannan  44.514  Fan Kexin  44.556  Kim Dam-min  44.687
Standings (after 4 of 8 races): (1) Zhao 2410 points (2) Fan 2080 (3) Marianne St-Gelais  2000
1000 m:  Yang Shin-young  1:33.419  Marie-Ève Drolet  1:34.343  Zhou Yang  1:34.447
Standings (after 4 of 8 races): (1) Katherine Reutter  1968 points (2) Zhou 2080 (3) Lana Gehring  1538
3000 m relay:   4:16.249   4:16.361   4:20.137
Standings (after 3 of 6 races): (1) China 2800 points (2)  1850 (3)  1650

Ski jumping
World Cup in Lillehammer, Norway:
HS 138:  Thomas Morgenstern  283.0 points  Ville Larinto  273.6  Simon Ammann  272.1
Standings (after 4 of 26 events): (1) Morgenstern 325 points (2) Larinto 252 (3) Andreas Kofler  250

Snooker
UK Championship in Telford, England, Last 32:
Graeme Dott  [11] 9–5 Martin Gould 
John Higgins  [4] 9–6 Stephen Lee 
Peter Ebdon  [13] 7–9 Andrew Higginson 
Neil Robertson  [2] 9–1 Rory McLeod

Speed skating
World Cup 4 in Changchun, China:
Men's:
500 m:  Tucker Fredricks  35.26  Jan Smeekens  35.27  Lee Kyu-Hyeok  35.32
Standings (after 6 of 12 races): (1) Joji Kato  455 points (2) Lee Kang-Seok  450 (3) Lee Kyu-Hyeok 365
1000 m:  Stefan Groothuis  1:09.39  Simon Kuipers  1:10.11  Lee Kyu-Hyeok  1:10.13
Standings (after 4 of 8 races): (1) Groothuis 330 points (2) Kuipers 290 (3) Lee 262
Women's:
500 m:  Lee Sang-hwa  38.22  Yu Jing  38.27  Jenny Wolf  38.44
Standings (after 6 of 12 races): (1) Wolf 550 points (2) Lee 470 (3) Margot Boer  410
1000 m:  Christine Nesbitt  1:16.55  Heather Richardson  1:17.59  Nao Kodaira  1:17.98
Standings (after 4 of 8 races): (1) Nesbitt 400 points (2) Richardson 290 (3) Margot Boer  260

Tennis
Davis Cup Final in Belgrade, day 3:  3–2 
Novak Djokovic  def. Gaël Monfils  6–2, 6–2, 6–4
Viktor Troicki  def. Michaël Llodra  6–2, 6–2, 6–3
Serbia win the Cup for the first time.

December 4, 2010 (Saturday)

Alpine skiing
Men's World Cup in Beaver Creek, United States:
Super-G:  Georg Streitberger  1:17.18  Adrien Théaux  1:17.29  Didier Cuche  1:17.31
Super-G standings (after 2 of 7 races): (1) Streitberger 118 points (2) Tobias Grünenfelder  110 (3) Cuche 105
Overall standings (after 4 of 38 races): (1) Mario Scheiber  175 points (2) Michael Walchhofer  149 (3) Streitberger 136
Women's World Cup in Lake Louise, Canada:
Downhill:  Maria Riesch  1:29.60  Lindsey Vonn  1:29.70  Dominique Gisin  1:30.38
Downhill standings (after 2 of 9 races): (1) Riesch 200 points (2) Vonn 160 (3) Elisabeth Görgl  105
Overall standings (after 6 of 38 races): (1) Riesch 434 points (2) Vonn 245 (3) Görgl 212

American football
NCAA Division I FBS (unbeaten teams in bold):
Conference championship games (BCS ranking in parentheses):
SEC Championship Game in Atlanta: (1) Auburn 56, (19) South Carolina 17
The Tigers finish the regular season with a perfect 13–0 record, and secure a berth in the BCS National Championship Game.
Big 12 Championship Game in Arlington, Texas: (9) Oklahoma 23, (13) Nebraska 20
ACC Championship Game in Charlotte, North Carolina: (15) Virginia Tech 44, (21) Florida State 33
Conference USA Championship Game in Orlando, Florida: UCF 17, SMU 7
Other BCS Top 10 teams:
The Civil War: (2) Oregon 37, Oregon State 20
The Ducks finish the regular season with a perfect 12–0 record, and secure a berth in the BCS National Championship Game.
Idle: (3) TCU, (4) Stanford, (5) Wisconsin, (6) Ohio State, (7) Arkansas, (8) Michigan State, (10) LSU
Other games:
Big East Conference:
(24) West Virginia 35, Rutgers 14
Pittsburgh 28, Cincinnati 10
Connecticut 19, South Florida 16
The three winning teams all claim a share of the Big East title, with UConn winning the tiebreaker for the program's first-ever BCS berth.
Western Athletic Conference:
(11) Boise State 50, Utah State 14
(17) Nevada 35, Louisiana Tech 17
The Broncos and Wolf Pack share the Conference championship with Hawaii.
Sun Belt Conference:
Troy 44, Florida Atlantic 7
Middle Tennessee 28, FIU 27
The Trojans and Golden Panthers share the title.
NCAA Division I Football Championship (FCS) Second Round (seeds in parentheses):
(1) Appalachian State 42, Western Illinois 14
Villanova 54, Stephen F. Austin 24
(5) Eastern Washington 37, Southeast Missouri State 17
North Dakota State 42, (4) Montana State 17
(3) Delaware 42, Lehigh 20
New Hampshire 45, Bethune–Cookman 20
Wofford 17, Jacksonville State 14
Georgia Southern 31, (2) William & Mary 15

Auto racing
V8 Supercars:
Sydney Telstra 500, Race 25 in Sydney, New South Wales: (1) Jonathon Webb  (Ford Falcon) (2) Jason Bright  (Holden Commodore) (3) Rick Kelly  (Holden Commodore)
Drivers' championship standings (after 25 of 26 races): (1) James Courtney  (Ford Falcon) 2992 points (2) Jamie Whincup  (Holden Commodore) 2879 (3) Mark Winterbottom  (Ford Falcon) 2729

Biathlon
World Cup 1 in Östersund, Sweden:
Men's 10 km Sprint:  Emil Hegle Svendsen  25:01.0 (1+0)  Ole Einar Bjørndalen  25:05.8 (0+0)  Martin Fourcade  25:16.2 (0+0)
Overall standings (after 2 of 26 races): (1) Svendsen 120 points (2) Bjørndalen 108 (3) Fourcade 96

Bobsleigh
World Cup in Calgary, Canada:
Four-man:  Manuel Machata/Andreas Bredau/Michail Makarow/Christian Poser  1:47.99 (53.94 / 54.05)  Karl Angerer/Gregor Bermbach/Alex Mann/Christian Friedrich  1:48.19 (54.05 / 54.14)  Maximilian Arndt/Rene Tiefert/Martin Putze/Alexander Rödiger  1:48.23 (54.07 / 54.16)
Standings (after 2 of 8 races): (1) Machata 425 points (2) Arndt 410 (3) Steve Holcomb  409

Cricket
England in Australia:
Ashes series:
Second Test in Adelaide, day 2:  245;  317/2 (89 overs; Alastair Cook 136*). England lead by 72 runs with 8 wickets remaining in the 1st innings.
New Zealand in India:
3rd ODI in Vadodara:  224/9 (50 overs);  229/1 (39.3 overs; Gautam Gambhir 126*). India win by 9 wickets; lead 5-match series 3–0.
West Indies in Sri Lanka:
3rd Test in Kandy, day 4:  303/8 (103.3 overs); .
ICC Intercontinental Cup Final in Dubai, United Arab Emirates, day 3:
 212 & 82 (47.3 overs);  171 & 124/3 (26.4 overs). Afghanistan win by 7 wickets.
Afghanistan win the Cup for the first time.
ICC Intercontinental Shield Final in Dubai, United Arab Emirates, day 3:
 79 & 403/8 (164 overs; Saqib Ali 139*, Sarel Burger 5/80);  320. United Arab Emirates lead by 162 runs with 2 wickets remaining.

Cross-country skiing
World Cup in Düsseldorf, Germany:
Men's Sprint Freestyle:  Emil Jönsson   Fulvio Scola   Øystein Pettersen 
Sprint standings (after 2 of 11 races): (1) Jönsson 130 points (2) Scola 88 (3) John Kristian Dahl  86
Overall standings (after 6 of 31 races): (1) Alexander Legkov  318 points (2) Dario Cologna  311 (3) Marcus Hellner  265
Women's Sprint Freestyle:  Arianna Follis   Kikkan Randall   Vesna Fabjan 
Sprint standings (after 2 of 11 races): (1) Follis 130 points (2) Randall 80 (3) Fabjan 60
Overall standings (after 6 of 31 races): (1) Marit Bjørgen  440 points (2) Charlotte Kalla  311 (3) Justyna Kowalczyk  309

Curling
European Championships in Champéry, Switzerland:
Men draw 1:
Sweden  8–3 
Norway  4–1 
France  7–1 
Czech Republic  7–8 
Germany  7–2 
Men draw 2:
Denmark  6–3 
Switzerland  5–3 
Russia  6–7 
Scotland  5–9 
Norway  7–3 
Women draw 1:
Finland  2–9 
Scotland  8–5 
Latvia  3–10 
Denmark  5–6 
Norway  7–5 
Women draw 2:
Norway  6–5 
Finland  8–9 
Germany  9–3 
Sweden  5–4 
Russia  8–5

Equestrianism
Show jumping:
FEI World Cup North American League – East Coast:
11th competition in Wellington (CSI 2*-W):  Paulo Santana  on Taloubet  Charlie Jayne  on Athena  Kate Levy  on Lirving du Volsin

Football (soccer)
AFF Suzuki Cup: (team in bold advance to the semi-finals)
Group A in Jakarta, Indonesia:
 0–0 
 0–6 
Standings (after 2 matches): Indonesia 6 points, Thailand 2, Malaysia, Laos 1.
CAF Confederation Cup Final, second leg: (first leg score in parentheses)
CS Sfaxien  2–3 (0–0)  FUS Rabat. FUS Rabat win 3–2 on aggregate.
FUS Rabat win the Cup for the first time.
OFC Champions League Group stage, matchday 3:
Group A: Amicale  2–0  Koloale
Standings: Amicale 6 points (3 matches),  Lautoka 6 (2),  PRK Hekari United 3 (2), Koloale 0 (3).
Group B: AS Magenta  1–1  Waitakere United
Standings (after 3 matches):  Auckland City FC, Waitakere United 5 points, AS Magenta 4,  AS Tefana 1.

Luge
World Cup in Winterberg, Germany:
Men's singles:  Armin Zöggeler  1:44.322 (52.183 / 52.139)  David Möller  1:44.541 (52.256 / 52.285)  Julian von Schleinitz  1:44.601 (52.281 / 52.320)
Standings (after 2 of 9 races): (1) Zöggeler 170 points (2) Möller 170 (3) Felix Loch  160
Doubles:  Tobias Wendl/Tobias Arlt  1:26.832 (43.415 / 43.417)  Christian Oberstolz/Patrick Gruber  1:26.842 (43.412 / 43.430)  Christian Niccum/Jayson Terdiman  1:27.159 (43.657 / 43.502)
Standings (after 2 of 9 races): (1) Oberstolz/Gruber 170 points (2) Wendl/Arlt 160 (3) Niccum/Terdiman 125

Nordic combined
World Cup in Trondheim, Norway:
HS 138 / 10 km:  Mikko Kokslien  24:16.6  Jason Lamy-Chappuis  24:25.0  Felix Gottwald  24:29.9
Overall standings (after 3 of 12 races): (1) Lamy-Chappuis 240 points (2) Gottwald 210 (3) Kokslien 209

Rugby union
IRB Sevens World Series:
Dubai Sevens in Dubai, United Arab Emirates:
Shield:  26–0 
Bowl:  21–0 
Plate:  19–12 
Cup:  21–29 
End of year tests:
Week 7:
Barbarians 26–20  in London

Short track speed skating
World Cup 3 in Changchun, China:
Men's:
500m:  Han Jialiang  42.447  Thibaut Fauconnet  42.910  Ryan Bedford  43.002
Standings (after 3 of 8 races): (1) François-Louis Tremblay  1512 points (2) Liang Wenhao  1475 (3) Charles Hamelin  1210
1500m:  Lee Ho-Suk  2:26.632  Liu Xianwei  2:26.779  Jeff Simon  2:26.880
Standings (after 4 of 8 races): (1) Simon 1850 points (2) Guillaume Bastille  1747 (3) Maxime Chataignier  1307
Women's:
500m:  Zhao Nannan  44.100  Liu Qiuhong  44.228  Fan Kexin  44.388
Standings (after 3 of 8 races): (1) Marianne St-Gelais  2000 points (2) Arianna Fontana  1600 (3) Zhao 1578
1500m:  Katherine Reutter  2:27.904  Cho Ha-Ri  2:28.008  Biba Sakurai  2:28.394
Standings (after 4 of 8 races): (1) Reutter 2800 points (2) Zhou Yang  2440 (3) Sakurai 1490

Ski jumping
World Cup in Lillehammer, Norway:
HS 138:  Thomas Morgenstern  281.4 points  Johan Remen Evensen  276.9  Tom Hilde  272.8
Standings (after 3 of 26 events): (1) Morgenstern 225 points (2) Andreas Kofler  200 (3) Ville Larinto  172

Snooker
UK Championship in Telford, England, Last 32:
Ding Junhui  [1] 9–4 Matthew Stevens 
Mark Allen  [12] 9–5 Tom Ford 
Stephen Maguire  [6] 9–6 Ken Doherty 
Mark Selby  [9] 9–6 Ricky Walden

Speed skating
World Cup 4 in Changchun, China:
Men's:
500 m:  Lee Kang-seok  35.10  Joji Kato  35.25  Keiichiro Nagashima  35.30
Standings (after 5 of 12 races): (1) Kato 410 points (2) Lee 390 (3) Nagashima 296
1000 m:  Stefan Groothuis  1:09.57  Lee Kyu-Hyeok  1:10.10  Simon Kuipers  1:10.27
Standings (after 3 of 8 races): (1) Groothuis 230 points (2) Kuipers 210 (3) Shani Davis  200
Women's:
500 m:  Lee Sang-hwa  38.24  Jenny Wolf  38.29  Nao Kodaira  38.51
Standings (after 5 of 12 races): (1) Wolf 480 points (2) Lee 370 (3) Margot Boer  360
1000 m:  Christine Nesbitt  1:16.07  Heather Richardson  1:17.49  Judith Hesse  1:18.04
Standings (after 3 of 8 races): (1) Nesbitt 300 points (2) Richardson 210 (3) Margot Boer  210

Tennis
Davis Cup Final in Belgrade, day 2:  1–2 
Arnaud Clément / Michaël Llodra  def. Viktor Troicki / Nenad Zimonjić  3–6, 6–7(3), 6–4, 7–5, 6–4

December 3, 2010 (Friday)

Alpine skiing
Men's World Cup in Beaver Creek, United States:
Downhill: Cancelled due to strong winds.
Women's World Cup in Lake Louise, Canada:
Downhill:  Maria Riesch  1:28.96  Lindsey Vonn  1:29.08  Elisabeth Görgl  1:29.17
Overall standings (after 5 of 38 races): (1) Riesch 334 points (2) Tanja Poutiainen  196 (3) Viktoria Rebensburg  180

American football
NCAA Division I FBS (BCS ranking in parentheses):
MAC Championship Game in Detroit: Miami (OH) 26, (25) Northern Illinois 21
The RedHawks win the championship for the first time since 2003 and 15th time overall.

Biathlon
World Cup 1 in Östersund, Sweden:
Women's 7.5 km Sprint:  Kaisa Mäkäräinen  22:42.1 (0+0)  Miriam Gössner  23:00.8 (0+0)  Darya Domracheva  23:29.2 (0+1)
Overall standings (after 2 of 26 races): (1) Anna Carin Zidek  92 points (2) Mäkäräinen 90 (3) Helena Ekholm  88

Bobsleigh
World Cup in Calgary, Canada:
Two-man:  Karl Angerer/Gregor Bermbach  1:50.57 (55.07 / 55.50)  Manuel Machata/Andreas Bredau  1:50.77 (55.25 / 55.52)  Patrice Servelle/Lascelles Brown  1:50.77 (55.28 / 55.49)
Standings (after 2 of 8 races): (1) Machata & Angerer 435 points (3) Lyndon Rush  394
Women:  Cathleen Martini/Berit Wiacker  1:53.57 (57.01 / 56.56)  Sandra Kiriasis/Christin Senkel  1:53.89 (56.92 / 56.97)  Helen Upperton/Shelley-Ann Brown  1:54.08 (57.11 / 56.97)
Standings (after 2 of 8 races): (1) Kiriasis 435 points (2) Martini 417 (3) Kaillie Humphries  392

Cricket
England in Australia:
Ashes series:
Second Test in Adelaide, day 1:  245 (85.5 overs);  1/0 (1 over). England trail by 244 runs with 10 wickets remaining in the 1st innings.
West Indies in Sri Lanka:
3rd Test in Kandy, day 3:  244/5 (81 overs); .
Zimbabwe in Bangladesh:
2nd ODI in Mirpur:  191 (46.2 overs; Abdur Razzak 5/30);  194/4 (39.4 overs). Bangladesh win by 6 wickets; 5-match series level 1–1.
ICC Intercontinental Cup Final in Dubai, United Arab Emirates, day 2:
 212 & 64/6 (38.3 overs);  171 (60.1 overs). Scotland lead by 105 runs with 4 wickets remaining.
ICC Intercontinental Shield Final in Dubai, United Arab Emirates, day 2:
 79 & 200/5 (77 overs);  320 (75.2 overs). United Arab Emirates trail by 41 runs with 5 wickets remaining.

Football (soccer)
Caribbean Championship Final Tournament in Martinique:
Semifinals in Fort-de-France:
 1–2 
 2–1 (a.e.t.) 
OFC Champions League Group stage, matchday 3:
Group B: AS Tefana  1–1  Auckland City FC

Tennis
Davis Cup Final in Belgrade, day 1:  1–1 
Gaël Monfils  def. Janko Tipsarević  6–1, 7–6(4), 6–0
Novak Djokovic  def. Gilles Simon  6–3, 6–1, 7–5

December 2, 2010 (Thursday)

American football
NFL Thursday Night Football, Week 13: Philadelphia Eagles 34, Houston Texans 24
NCAA Division I FBS BCS Top 25:
Territorial Cup: Arizona State 30, (23) Arizona 29 (2OT)

Basketball
Euroleague Regular Season, matchday 7 (teams in bold advance to the Top 16):
Group A: Žalgiris Kaunas  68–71  Maccabi Tel Aviv
Standings (after 7 games): Maccabi Tel Aviv 6–1, Žalgiris Kaunas,  Partizan Belgrade 4–3,  Khimki Moscow 3–4,  Caja Laboral,  Asseco Prokom Gdynia 2–5.
Group B:
Olympiacos Piraeus  86–69  Brose Baskets
Unicaja Málaga  75–71  Real Madrid
Virtus Roma  95–83  Spirou Basket
Standings (after 7 games): Olympiacos Piraeus 5–2, Real Madrid, Unicaja Málaga, Virtus Roma 4–3, Brose Baskets, Spirou Basket 2–5.
Group C: Regal FC Barcelona  76–62  Cholet Basket
Standings (after 7 games):  Fenerbahçe Ülker,  Montepaschi Siena 6–1, Regal FC Barcelona 5–2, Cholet Basket 3–4,  Lietuvos Rytas 1–6,  KK Cibona Zagreb 0–7.
Group D:
Power Electronics Valencia  62–56  Efes Pilsen Istanbul
Union Olimpija Ljubljana  82–75  Armani Jeans Milano
Standings (after 7 games): Union Olimpija Ljubljana,  Panathinaikos Athens 5–2, Efes Pilsen Istanbul 4–3, Armani Jeans Milano, Power Electronics Valencia 3–4,  CSKA Moscow 1–6.

Biathlon
World Cup 1 in Östersund, Sweden:
Men's 20 km Individual:  Emil Hegle Svendsen  55:07.7 (0+1+0+1)  Ole Einar Bjørndalen  55:26.8 (0+0+0+2)  Martin Fourcade  55:45.5 (0+1+0+0)

Bobsleigh
World Cup in Calgary, Canada:
Team:   I (Frank Rommel, Stefanie Szczurek, Kristin Steinert, Anja Huber, Manuel Machata, Florian Becke) 3:47.86 (56.76 / 57.21 / 58.22 / 55.67)   I (Jon Montgomery, Mellissa These, Baadsvik Emily, Amy Gough, Lyndon Rush, Justin Wilkinson) 3:49.35 (57.26 / 57.53 / 58.82 / 55.74)   II (Sergey Chudinov, Anastasiya Skulkina, Yana Vinokhodova, Olga Potelitcina, Alexey Gorlachev, Ilya Ivanov) 3:49.61 (56.68 / 58.10 / 59.00 / 55.83)

Cricket
West Indies in Sri Lanka:
3rd Test in Kandy, day 2:  244/5 (81 overs); .
ICC Intercontinental Cup Final in Dubai, United Arab Emirates, day 1:
 212 (88.4 overs; Neil McCallum 104*, Hamid Hassan 5/45);  18/1 (4 overs). Afghanistan trail by 194 runs with 9 wickets remaining in the 1st innings.
ICC Intercontinental Shield Final in Dubai, United Arab Emirates, day 1:
 79 (25.3 overs, Bernie Burger 7/38);  267/3 (61 overs; Craig Williams 116). Namibia lead by 188 runs with 7 wickets remaining in the 1st innings.

Football (soccer)
FIFA Executive Committee selects the 2018 and 2022 FIFA World Cup hosts:
2018: Russia win the rights to the tournament, amassing an unassailable 13 of the 22 votes in the second round.
2022: Qatar win the rights to the tournament, defeating the United States by 14 votes to 8 in the final round.
Russia and Qatar are both first-time hosts and are the largest (by area) and smallest (by both area and population) countries respectively to host the FIFA World Cup, and also the first hosts from Eastern Europe or Western Asia.
AFF Suzuki Cup:
Group B in Hanoi, Vietnam:
 1–1 
 7–1 
UEFA Europa League group stage, matchday 5: (teams in bold advance to the Round of 32)
Group D:
Villarreal  3–0  Dinamo Zagreb
PAOK  1–1  Club Brugge
Standings (after 5 matches): Villarreal 9 points, PAOK 8, Dinamo Zagreb 7, Club Brugge 3.
Group E:
Sheriff Tiraspol  1–1  AZ
BATE  1–4  Dynamo Kyiv
Standings (after 5 matches): Dynamo Kyiv, BATE 10 points, AZ, Sheriff Tiraspol 4.
Group F:
Palermo  2–2  Sparta Prague
CSKA Moscow  5–1  Lausanne-Sport
Standings (after 5 matches): CSKA Moscow 15 points, Sparta Prague 8, Palermo 4, Lausanne-Sport 1.
Group J:
Borussia Dortmund  3–0  Karpaty Lviv
Paris Saint-Germain  4–2  Sevilla
Standings (after 5 matches): Paris Saint-Germain 11 points, Sevilla 9, Borussia Dortmund 8, Karpaty Lviv 0.
Group K:
Utrecht  3–3  Napoli
Steaua București  1–1  Liverpool
Standings (after 5 matches): Liverpool 9 points, Steaua București 6, Napoli, Utrecht 4.
Group L:
CSKA Sofia  1–2  Beşiktaş
Rapid Wien  1–3  Porto
Standings (after 5 matches): Porto 13 points, Beşiktaş 10, Rapid Wien, CSKA Sofia 3.
 Primera División de México Apertura Liguilla Final, first leg:
Santos Laguna 3–2 Monterrey

Skeleton
World Cup in Calgary, Canada:
Men:  Martins Dukurs  1:52.14 (56.10 / 56.04)  Aleksandr Tretyakov  1:52.23 (56.17 / 56.06)  Kristan Bromley  1:52.98 (56.54 / 56.44)
Standings (after 2 of 8 races): (1) Tretyakov & Bromley 410 points (3) Dukurs 409
Women:  Anja Huber  1:55.84 (57.93 / 57.91)  Shelley Rudman  1:56.61 (58.15 / 58.46)  Amy Gough  1:56.89 (58.35 / 58.54)
Standings (after 2 of 8 races): (1) Huber 425 points (2) Marion Thees  409 (3) Mellisa Hollingsworth  402
Team:   I (Frank Rommel, Stefanie Szczurek, Kristin Steinert, Anja Huber, Manuel Machata, Florian Becke) 3:47.86 (56.76 / 57.21 / 58.22 / 55.67)   I (Jon Montgomery, Mellissa These, Baadsvik Emily, Amy Gough, Lyndon Rush, Justin Wilkinson) 3:49.35 (57.26 / 57.53 / 58.82 / 55.74)   II (Sergey Chudinov, Anastasiya Skulkina, Yana Vinokhodova, Olga Potelitcina, Alexey Gorlachev, Ilya Ivanov) 3:49.61 (56.68 / 58.10 / 59.00 / 55.83)

December 1, 2010 (Wednesday)

Basketball
Euroleague Regular Season, matchday 7 (teams in bold advance to the Top 16):
Group A:
Khimki Moscow  92–65  Partizan Belgrade
Caja Laboral  75–81  Asseco Prokom Gdynia
Standings:  Maccabi Tel Aviv 5–1,  Žalgiris Kaunas 4–2, Partizan 4–3, Khimki Moscow 3–4, Caja Laboral, Asseco Prokom Gdynia 2–5.
Group C:
Fenerbahçe Ülker  100–70  KK Cibona Zagreb
Montepaschi Siena  90–72  Lietuvos Rytas
Standings: Fenerbahçe Ülker, Montepaschi Siena 6–1,  Regal FC Barcelona 4–2,  Cholet Basket 3–3, Lietuvos Rytas 1–6, Cibona Zagreb 0–7.
Group D: CSKA Moscow  68–72  Panathinaikos Athens
Standings: Panathinaikos 5–2,  Efes Pilsen Istanbul,  Union Olimpija Ljubljana 4–2,  Armani Jeans Milano 3–3,  Power Electronics Valencia 2–4, CSKA Moscow 1–6.

Biathlon
World Cup 1 in Östersund, Sweden:
Women's 15 km Individual:  Anna Carin Olofsson-Zidek  45:26.1 (0+0+0+0)  Marie-Laure Brunet  45:35.0 (1+0+0+1)  Helena Ekholm  46:08.8 (1+0+0+1)

Cricket
West Indies in Sri Lanka:
3rd Test in Kandy, day 1:  134/2 (40 overs); .
New Zealand in India:
2nd ODI in Jaipur:  258/8 (50 overs);  259/2 (43 overs, Gautam Gambhir 138*). India win by 8 wickets; lead 5-match series 2–0.
Zimbabwe in Bangladesh:
1st ODI in Mirpur:  209 (49 overs);  200 (49 overs). Zimbabwe win by 9 runs; lead 5-match series 1–0.

Football (soccer)
Caribbean Championship Final Tournament in Martinique: (teams in bold advance to the semi-finals and qualify for 2011 CONCACAF Gold Cup)
Group I in Riviére-Pilote:
 1–0 
 0–4 
Final standings: Jamaica 9 points, Guadeloupe 4, Antigua and Barbuda 3, Guyana 1.
AFF Suzuki Cup:
Group A in Jakarta, Indonesia:
 2–2 
 5–1 
UEFA Europa League group stage, matchday 5: (teams in bold advance to the Round of 32)
Group A:
Lech Poznań  1–1  Juventus
Manchester City  3–0  Red Bull Salzburg
Standings (after 5 matches): Manchester City 10 points, Lech Poznań 8, Juventus 5, Red Bull Salzburg 2.
Group B:
Atlético Madrid  2–3  Aris
Rosenborg  0–1  Bayer Leverkusen
Standings (after 5 matches): Bayer Leverkusen 11 points, Aris, Atlético Madrid 7, Rosenborg 3.
Group C:
Gent  1–0  Levski Sofia
Sporting CP  1–0  Lille
Standings (after 5 matches): Sporting CP 12 points, Gent 7, Lille 5, Levski Sofia 4.
Group G:
Hajduk Split  1–3  AEK Athens
Zenit St. Petersburg  3–1  Anderlecht
Standings (after 5 matches): Zenit St. Petersburg 15 points, AEK Athens 7, Anderlecht 4, Hajduk Split 3.
Group H:
Odense  1–1  Getafe
Young Boys  4–2  Stuttgart
Standings (after 5 matches): Stuttgart 12 points, Young Boys 9, Getafe, Odense 4.
Group I:
Metalist Kharkiv  2–1  Debrecen
Sampdoria  1–2  PSV Eindhoven
Standings (after 5 matches): PSV Eindhoven 13 points, Metalist Kharkiv 10, Sampdoria 5, Debrecen 0.
Copa Sudamericana Finals, first leg:
Goiás  2–0  Independiente

Rugby union
 sweeps the three major IRB Awards in the last of this year's awards cycle:
The All Blacks are named Team of the Year for the fourth time.
Head coach Graham Henry is named Coach of the Year for a fourth time.
Captain Richie McCaw is named Player of the Year for a third time, and is also the first player to claim the award in consecutive years.

Ski jumping
World Cup in Kuopio, Finland:
HS 127:  Ville Larinto  240.9 points  Matti Hautamäki  240.8  Simon Ammann  238.3
Standings (after 2 of 26 events): (1) Andreas Kofler  150 points (2) Larinto 140 (3) Thomas Morgenstern  & Hautamäki 125

References

XII